This is a list of disorder codes in the Online Mendelian Inheritance in Man (OMIM) database. These are diseases that can be inherited via a Mendelian genetic mechanism. OMIM is one of the databases housed in the U.S. National Center for Biotechnology Information.

 Isolated 17,20-lyase deficiency; ; CYP17A1
 17-alpha-hydroxylase/17,20-lyase deficiency; ; CYP17A1
 17-beta-hydroxysteroid dehydrogenase X deficiency; ; HSD17B10
 2-methylbutyrylglycinuria; ; ACADSB
 3-hydroxyacyl-coa dehydrogenase deficiency; ; HADHSC
 3-hydroxyisobutryl-CoA hydrolase deficiency; ; HIBCH
 3-M syndrome; ; CUL7
 3-Methylcrotonyl-CoA carboxylase 1 deficiency; ; MCCC1
 3-Methylcrotonyl-CoA carboxylase 2 deficiency; ; MCCC2
 3-Methylglutaconic aciduria type I; ; AUH
 3-Methylglutaconic aciduria type III; ; OPA3
 3-Methylglutaconic aciduria type V; ; DNAJC19
 46XX true hermaphroditism; ; SRY
 46XY complete gonadal dysgenesis; ; DHH
 46XY complete gonadal dysgenesis; ; SRY
 46XY gonadal dysgenesis, complete or partial, with or without adrenal failure; ; NR5A1
 46XY gonadal dysgenesis, complete, CBS2-related; ; CBX2
 46XY partial gonadal dysgenesis, with minifascicular neuropathy; ; DHH
 5-fluorouracil toxicity; ; DPYD
 6-mercaptopurine sensitivity; ; TPMT
 Aarskog–Scott syndrome; ; FGD1
 ABCD syndrome; ; EDNRB
 Abetalipoproteinemia; ; MTP
 ACAD9 deficiency; ; ACAD9
 Acampomelic campomelic dysplasia; ; SOX9
 Achalasia-Addisonianism-Alacrimia syndrome; ; AAAS
 Acheiropody; ; LMBR1
 Achondrogenesis Ib; ; SLC26A2
 Achondrogenesis type 1A; ; TRIP11
 Achondrogenesis-hypochondrogenesis type 2; ; COL2A1
 Achondroplasia; ; FGFR3
 Achromatopsia-2; ; CNGA3
 Achromatopsia-3; ; CNGB3
 Acrocallosal syndrome; ; GLI3
 Acrocapitofemoral dysplasia; ; IHH
 Acrodermatitis enteropathica; ; SLC39A4
 Acrokeratosis verruciformis; ; ATP2A2
 Acromesomelic dysplasia, Hunter-Thompson type; ; GDF5
 Acromesomelic dysplasia, Maroteaux type; ; NPR2
 Action myoclonus-renal failure syndrome; ; SCARB2
 Acyl-CoA dehydrogenase, long chain, deficiency of; ; ACADL
 Acyl-CoA dehydrogenase, medium chain, deficiency of; ; ACADM
 Acyl-CoA dehydrogenase, short chain, deficiency of; ; ACADS
 Adenocarcinoma of lung, response to tyrosine kinase inhibitor in; ; EGFR
 Adenocarcinoma of lung, somatic; ; BRAF
 Adenocarcinoma of lung, somatic; ; ERBB2
 Adenocarcinoma of lung, somatic; ; PRKN
 Adenocarcinoma, ovarian, somatic; ; PRKN
 Adenomas, multiple colorectal; ; MUTYH
 Adenomas, salivary gland pleomorphic; ; PLAG1
 Adenomatous polyposis coli; ; APC
 Adenosine deaminase deficiency, partial; ; ADA
 Adenosine triphosphate, elevated, of erythrocytes; ; PKLR
 Adenylosuccinase deficiency; ; ADSL
 Adiponectin deficiency; ; ADIPOQ
 Adrenal cortical carcinoma; ; TP53
 Adrenal hyperplasia, congenital, due to 11-beta-hydroxylase deficiency; ; CYP11B1
 Adrenal hyperplasia, congenital, due to combined P450C17 and P450C21 deficiency; ; POR
 Adrenal hypoplasia, congenital, with hypogonadotropic hypogonadism; ; DAX1
 Adrenocorticotropic hormone deficiency; ; TBS19
 Adrenoleukodystrophy; ; ABCD1
 Adrenoleukodystrophy, neonatal; ; PEX1
 Adrenoleukodystrophy, neonatal; ; PEX10
 Adrenoleukodystrophy, neonatal; ; PEX13
 Adrenoleukodystrophy, neonatal; ; PEX26
 Adrenoleukodystrophy, neonatal; ; PEX5
 Adrenomyeloneuropathy; ; ABCD1
 Adult i phenotype with congenital cataract; ; GCNT2
 Adult i phenotype without cataract; ; GCNT2
 ADULT syndrome; ; TP63
 Advanced sleep phase syndrome, familial; ; PER2
 Afibrinogenemia, congenital; ; FGA
 Afibrinogenemia, congenital; ; FGB
 Agammaglobulinemia 1; ; IGHM
 Agammaglobulinemia 2; ; IGLL1
 Agammaglobulinemia 4; ; BLNK
 Agammaglobulinemia 5; ; LRRC8A
 Agammaglobulinemia and isolated hormone deficiency; ; BTK
 Agammaglobulinemia, type 1, X-linked; ; BTK
 AGAT deficiency; ; GATM
 Agenesis of the corpus callosum with peripheral neuropathy; ; SLC12A6
 Aicardi–Goutières syndrome 1, dominant and recessive; ; TREX1
 Aicardi–Goutières syndrome 2; ; RNASEH2B
 Aicardi–Goutières syndrome 3; ; RNASEH2C
 Aicardi–Goutières syndrome 4; ; RNASEH2A
 Aicardi–Goutières syndrome 5; ; SAMHD1
 AICA-ribosiduria due to ATIC deficiency; ; ATIC
 Alagille syndrome 2; ; NOTCH2
 Alagille syndrome; ; JAG1
 Aland Island eye disease; ; CACNA1F
 Albinism, brown oculocutaneous; ; OCA2
 Albinism, brown; ; TYRP1
 Albinism, oculocutaneous, type IA; ; TYR
 Albinism, oculocutaneous, type IB; ; TYR
 Albinism, oculocutaneous, type II; ; OCA2
 Albinism, rufous; ; TYRP1
 Alcohol sensitivity, acute; ; ALDH2
 Aldosteronism, glucocorticoid-remediable; ; CYP11B1
 Alexander disease; ; GFAP
 Alexander disease; ; NDUFV1
 Alkaptonuria; ; HGD
 Allan–Herndon–Dudley syndrome; ; SLC16A2
 Alopecia universalis; ; HR
 Alopecia, neurologic defects, and endocrinopathy syndrome; ; RBM28
 Alpers syndrome; ; POLG
 Alpha/beta T-cell lymphopenia with gamma/delta T-cell expansion, severe cytomegalovirus infection, and autoimmunity; ; RAG1
 Alpha-2-plasmin inhibitor deficiency; ; PLI
 Alpha-ketoglutarate dehydrogenase deficiency; ; OGDH
 Alpha-methylacetoacetic aciduria; ; ACAT1
 Alpha-thalassemia myelodysplasia syndrome, somatic; ; ATRX
 Alpha-thalassemia mental retardation syndrome; ; ATRX
 Alport syndrome; ; COL4A5
 Alport syndrome, autosomal recessive; ; COL4A3
 Alport syndrome, autosomal recessive; ; COL4A4
 Alström syndrome; ; ALMS1
 Alternating hemiplegia of childhood; ; ATP1A2
 Alveolar capillary dysplasia with misalignment of pulmonary veins; ; FOXF1
 Alveolar soft part sarcoma; ; ASPSCR1
 Alzheimer disease 1, familial; ; APP
 Alzheimer disease 6; ; AD6
 Alzheimer disease 8; ; AD8
 Alzheimer disease, late-onset, susceptibility to; ; NOS3
 Alzheimer disease, type 3; ; PSEN1
 Alzheimer disease, type 3, with spastic paraparesis and apraxia; ; PSEN1
 Alzheimer disease, type 3, with spastic paraparesis and unusual plaques; ; PSEN1
 Alzheimer disease-10; ; AD10
 Alzheimer disease-2; ; APOE
 Alzheimer disease-4; ; PSEN2
 Alzheimer disease-5; ; AD5
 Amelogenesis imperfecta, hypomaturation type, IIA3; ; WDR72
 Amelogenesis imperfecta, hypomaturation-hypoplastic type, with taurodontism; ; DLX3
 Amelogenesis imperfecta, hypoplastic/hypomaturation type; ; AMELX
 Amelogenesis imperfecta, type 3; ; FAM83H
 Amelogenesis imperfecta, type IB; ; ENAM
 Amelogenesis imperfecta, type IC; ; ENAM
 Amelogenesis imperfecta, type IIA1; ; KLK4
 Amelogenesis imperfecta, type IIA2; ; MMP20
 Aminoacylase 1 deficiency; ; ACY1
 Amish infantile epilepsy syndrome; ; SIAT9
 Amyloidosis, 3 or more types; ; APOA1
 Amyloidosis, Finnish type; ; GSN
 Amyloidosis, hereditary renal; ; FGA
 Amyloidosis, hereditary, transthyretin-related; ; TTR
 Amyloidosis, primary localized cutaneous; ; OSMR
 Amyloidosis, renal; ; LYZ
 Amyotrophic lateral sclerosis 10, with or without FTD; ; TARDBP
 Amyotrophic lateral sclerosis 11; ; FIG4
 Amyotrophic lateral sclerosis 4, juvenile; ; SETX
 Amyotrophic lateral sclerosis 6, autosomal recessive; ; FUS
 Amyotrophic lateral sclerosis 8; ; VAPB
 Amyotrophic lateral sclerosis 9; ; ANG
 Amyotrophic lateral sclerosis, due to SOD1 deficiency; ; SOD1
 Amyotrophic lateral sclerosis, juvenile; ; ALS2
 Amyotrophy, hereditary neuralgic; ; 40430
 Amytrophic lateral sclerosis 12; ; OPTN
 Anauxetic dysplasia; ; RMRP
 Androgen insensitivity syndrome; ; AR
 Androgen insensitivity, partial, with or without breast cancer; ; AR
 Anemia, congenital dyserythropoietic, type I; ; CDAN1
 Anemia, dyserythropoietic congenital, type II; ; SEC23B
 Anemia, hemolytic, due to UMPH1 deficiency; ; NT5C3
 Anemia, hemolytic, Rh-null, regulator type; ; RHAG
 Anemia, hypochromic microcytic; ; NRAMP2
 Anemia, sideroblastic, pyridoxine-refractory, autosomal recessive; ; GLRX5
 Anemia, sideroblastic, pyridoxine-refractory, autosomal recessive; ; SLC25A38
 Anemia, sideroblastic, with ataxia; ; ABCB7
 Anemia, sideroblastic, X-linked; ; ALAS2
 Angelman syndrome; ; MECP2
 Angelman syndrome; ; UBE3A
 Angelman syndrome-like; ; CDKL5
 Angioedema, hereditary, type III; ; F12
 Angioedema, hereditary, types I and II; ; C1NH
 Angiopathy, hereditary, with nephropathy, aneurysms, and muscle cramps; ; COL4A1
 Aniridia; ; PAX6
 Anonychia congenita; ; RSPO4
 Anterior segment mesenchymal dysgenesis; ; FOXE3
 Anterior segment mesenchymal dysgenesis; ; PITX3
 Antithrombin III deficiency; ; AT3
 Antley–Bixler syndrome; ; FGFR2
 Antley–Bixler syndrome-like with disordered steroidogenesis; ; POR
 Anxiety-related personality traits; ; SLC6A4
 Aortic aneurysm, familial thoracic 4; ; MYH11
 Aortic aneurysm, familial thoracic 6; ; ACTA2
 Aortic valve disease; ; NOTCH1
 Apert syndrome; ; FGFR2
 Aphakia, congenital primary; ; FOXE3
 Aplasia of lacrimal and salivary glands; ; FGF10
 Aplastic anemia; ; TERC
 Argininemia; ; ARG1
 Argininosuccinic aciduria; ; ASL
 Aromatase deficiency; ; CYP19A1
 Aromatase excess syndrome; ; CYP19A1
 Aromatic L-amino acid decarboxylase deficiency; ; DDC
 Arrhythmogenic right ventricular dysplasia 1; ; TGFB3
 Arrhythmogenic right ventricular dysplasia 2; ; RYR2
 Arrhythmogenic right ventricular dysplasia 5; ; LAMR1
 Arrhythmogenic right ventricular dysplasia 8; ; DSP
 Arrhythmogenic right ventricular dysplasia, familial, 10; ; DSG2
 Arrhythmogenic right ventricular dysplasia, familial, 11; ; DSC2
 Arrhythmogenic right ventricular dysplasia, familial, 12; ; JUP
 Arrhythmogenic right ventricular dysplasia, familial, 5; ; TMEM43
 Arrhythmogenic right ventricular dysplasia, familial, 9; ; PKP2
 Arterial calcification, generalized, of infancy; ; ENPP1
 Arterial tortuosity syndrome; ; SLC2A10
 Arthrogryposis multiplex congenita, distal type 1; ; TPM2
 Arthrogryposis multiplex congenita, distal type 2B; ; TNNI2
 Arthrogryposis, distal, type 2A; ; MYH3
 Arthrogryposis, distal, type 2B; ; MYH3
 Arthrogryposis, distal, type 2B; ; TPM2
 Arthrogryposis, lethal, with anterior horn cell disease; ; GLE1
 Arthrogryposis, renal dysfunction, and cholestasis 1; ; VPS33B
 Arthrogryposis, renal dysfunction, and cholestasis 2; ; VIPAR
 Arthropathy, progressive pseudorheumatoid, of childhood; ; WISP3
 Arthyrgryposis, distal, type 2B; ; TNNT3
 Arts syndrome; ; PRPS1
 Aspartylglucosaminuria; ; AGA
 Asphyxiating thoracic dystrophy 2; ; IFT80
 Asphyxiating thoracic dystrophy 3; ; DYNC2H1
 Asthma and nasal polyps; ; TBX21
 Ataxia with isolated vitamin E deficiency; ; TTPA
 Ataxia, cerebellar, Cayman type; ; ATCAY
 Ataxia, early-onset, with oculomotor apraxia and hypoalbuminemia; ; APTX
 Ataxia–ocular apraxia-2; ; SETX
 Ataxia–telangiectasia; ; ATM
 Ataxia–telangiectasia-like disorder; ; MRE11A
 Atelosteogenesis II; ; SLC26A2
 Atelosteogenesis, type III; ; FLNB
 Atelostogenesis, type I; ; FLNB
 Athabaskan brainstem dysgenesis syndrome; ; HOXA1
 Atopy; ; SPINK5
 ATP synthase deficiency, nuclear-encoded; ; ATPAF2
 Atransferrinemia; ; TF
 Atrial fibrillation; ; GJA5
 Atrial fibrillation, familial, 3; ; KCNQ1
 Atrial fibrillation, familial, 4; ; KCNE2
 Atrial fibrillation, familial, 6; ; NPPA
 Atrial fibrillation, familial, 7; ; KCNA5
 Atrial septal defect 4; ; TBX20
 Atrial septal defect 5; ; ACTC1
 Atrial septal defect 6; ; TLL1
 Atrial septal defect with atrioventricular conduction defects; ; NKX2E
 Atrial septal defect-2; ; GATA4
 Atrichia with papular lesions; ; HR
 Atrioventricular canal defect; ; AVSD1
 Atrioventricular septal defect; ; GJA1
 Atrioventricular septal defect, partial, with heterotaxy syndrome; ; CRELD1
 Auditory neuropathy, autosomal recessive, 1; ; OTOF
 Autoimmune disease, syndromic multisystem; ; ITCH
 Autoimmune lymphoproliferative syndrome, type IA; ; TNFRSF6
 Autoimmune lymphoproliferative syndrome, type II; ; CASP10
 Autoimmune lymphoproliferative syndrome, type IIB; ; CASP8
 Autoimmune polyendocrinopathy syndrome, type I, with or without reversible metaphyseal dysplasia; ; AIRE
 Axenfeld–Rieger syndrome, type 1; ; PITX2
 Axenfeld–Rieger syndrome, type 3; ; FOXC1
 Azoospermia due to perturbations of meiosis; ; SYCP3
 Azoospermia; ; USP9Y
 Baller–Gerold syndrome; ; RECQL4
 Bamforth–Lazarus syndrome; ; FOXE1
 Bannayan–Riley–Ruvalcaba syndrome; ; PTEN
 Bardet–Biedl syndrome 1; ; BBS1
 Bardet–Biedl syndrome 10; ; BBS10
 Bardet–Biedl syndrome 11; ; TRIM32
 Bardet–Biedl syndrome 12; ; BBS12
 Bardet–Biedl syndrome 13; ; MKS1
 Bardet–Biedl syndrome 14; ; CEP290
 Bardet–Biedl syndrome 15; ; C2orf86
 Bardet–Biedl syndrome 2; ; BBS2
 Bardet–Biedl syndrome 3; ; ARL6
 Bardet–Biedl syndrome 4; ; BBS4
 Bardet–Biedl syndrome 5; ; BBS5
 Bardet–Biedl syndrome 6; ; MKKS
 Bardet–Biedl syndrome 7; ; BBS7
 Bardet–Biedl syndrome 8; ; TTC8
 Bardet–Biedl syndrome 9; ; PTHB1
 Bare lymphocyte syndrome, type I; ; TAP1
 Bare lymphocyte syndrome, type I; ; TAPBP
 Bare lymphocyte syndrome, type I, due to TAP2 deficiency; ; TAP2
 Bare lymphocyte syndrome, type II, complementation group A; ; MHC2TA
 Bare lymphocyte syndrome, type II, complementation group C; ; RFX5
 Bare lymphocyte syndrome, type II, complementation group D; ; RFXAP
 Bare lymphocyte syndrome, type II, complementation group E; ; RFX5
 Barth syndrome; ; TAZ
 Bart–Pumphrey syndrome; ; GJB2
 Bartter syndrome, type 1; ; SLC12A1
 Bartter syndrome, type 2; ; KCNJ1
 Bartter syndrome, type 3; ; CLCNKB
 Bartter syndrome, type 4, digenic; ; CLCNKB
 Bartter syndrome, type 4a; ; BSND
 Bartter syndrome, type 4b, digenic; ; CLCNKA
 Basal cell carcinoma, somatic; ; PTCH1
 Basal cell carcinoma, somatic; ; PTCH2
 Basal cell carcinoma, somatic; ; RASA1
 Basal cell nevus syndrome; ; PTCH1
 Basal ganglia disease, biotin-responsive; ; SLC19A3
 Basal laminar drusen; ; HF1
 BCG and salmonella infection, disseminated; ; IL12B
 BCG infection, generalized familial; ; IFNGR1
 Beare–Stevenson cutis gyrata syndrome; ; FGFR2
 Becker muscular dystrophy; ; DMD
 Beckwith–Wiedemann syndrome; ; CDKN1C
 Beckwith–Wiedemann syndrome; ; H19
 Beckwith–Wiedemann syndrome; ; KCNQ10T1
 Beckwith–Wiedemann syndrome; ; NSD1
 Bernard–Soulier syndrome, benign autosomal dominant; ; GP1BA
 Bernard–Soulier syndrome, type A; ; GP1BA
 Bernard–Soulier syndrome, type B; ; GP1BB
 Bernard–Soulier syndrome, type C; ; GP9
 Best macular dystrophy; ; BEST1
 Bestrophinopathy; ; BEST1
 Beta-ureidopropionase deficiency; ; UPB1
 Bethlem myopathy; ; COL6A1
 Bethlem myopathy; ; COL6A2
 Bethlem myopathy; ; COL6A3
 Bietti crystalline corneoretinal dystrophy; ; CYP4V2
 Bifid nose with or without anorectal and renal anomalies; ; FREM1
 Bile acid malabsorption, primary; ; SLC10A2
 Bile acid synthesis defect, congenital, 2; ; AKR1D1
 Bile acid synthesis defect, congenital, 4; ; AMACR
 Biotinidase deficiency; ; BTD
 Birk–Barel mental retardation dysmorphism syndrome; ; KCNK9
 Birt–Hogg–Dubé syndrome; ; FLCN
 Björnstad syndrome; ; BCS1L
 Bladder cancer; ; KRAS
 Bladder cancer; ; RB1
 Bladder cancer, somatic; ; FGFR3
 Blau syndrome; ; NOD2
 Bleeding disorder due to P2RY12 defect; ; P2RY12
 Blepharophimosis, epicanthus inversus, and ptosis, type 1; ; FOXL2
 Blepharophimosis, epicanthus inversus, and ptosis, type 2; ; FOXL2
 Blood group--Lutheran inhibitor; ; KLF1
 Bloom syndrome; ; RECQL3
 Blue cone monochromacy; ; OPN1MW
 Blue cone monochromacy; ; OPN1LW
 Boomerang dysplasia; ; FLNB
 Börjeson–Forssman–Lehmann syndrome; ; PHF6
 Bosley–Salih–Alorainy syndrome; ; HOXA1
 Bothnia retinal dystrophy; ; RLBP1
 Bowen–Conradi syndrome; ; EMG1
 Brachiootic syndrome 3; ; SIX1
 Brachydactyly type A1; ; BDA1B
 Brachydactyly type A1; ; IHH
 Brachydactyly type A2; ; BMPR1B
 Brachydactyly type A2; ; GDF5
 Brachydactyly type B1; ; ROR2
 Brachydactyly type B2; ; NOG
 Brachydactyly type C; ; GDF5
 Brachydactyly type D; ; HOXD13
 Brachydactyly type E; ; HOXD13
 Brachydactyly type E2; ; PTHLH
 Brachydactyly-syndactyly syndrome; ; HOXD13
 Brachyolmia type 3; ; TRPV4
 Bradyopsia; ; RGS9
 Bradyopsia; ; RGS9BP
 Brain small vessel disease with Axenfeld-Rieger anomaly; ; COL4A1
 Brain small vessel disease with hemorrhage; ; COL4A1
 Branchiooculofacial syndrome; ; TFAP2A
 Branchiootorenal syndrome 2; ; SIX5
 Branchiootorenal syndrome with cataract; ; EYA1
 Branchiootorenal syndrome; ; EYA1
 Breast cancer; ; PPM1D
 Breast cancer; ; SLC22A1L
 Breast cancer; ; TP53
 Breast cancer, early-onset; ; BRIP1
 Breast cancer, invasive ductal; ; RAD54L
 Breast cancer, somatic; ; AKT1
 Breast cancer, somatic; ; KRAS
 Breast cancer, somatic; ; PIK3CA
 Breast cancer, somatic; ; RB1CC1
 Brittle cornea syndrome; ; ZNF469
 Brody myopathy; ; ATP2A1
 Bronchiectasis with or without elevated sweat chloride 1; ; SCNN1B
 Bronchiectasis with or without elevated sweat chloride 2; ; SCNN1A
 Bronchiectasis with or without elevated sweat chloride 3; ; SCNN1G
 Brooke–Spiegler syndrome; ; CYLD1
 Brown–Vialetto–Van Laere syndrome; ; C20orf54
 Bruck syndrome 2; ; PLOD2
 Brugada syndrome 1; ; SCN5A
 Brugada syndrome 2; ; GPD1L
 Brugada syndrome 3; ; CACNA1C
 Brugada syndrome 4; ; CACNB2
 Brugada syndrome 5; ; SCN1B
 Brugada syndrome 6; ; KCNE3
 Brugada syndrome 7; ; SCN3B
 Brugada syndrome 8; ; HCN4
 Brunner syndrome; ; MAOA
 Burkitt's lymphoma; ; MYC
 Buschke–Ollendorff syndrome; ; LEMD3
 C syndrome; ; CD96
 C5 deficiency; ; C5
 C6 deficiency; ; C6
 C7 deficiency; ; C7
 Caffey disease; ; COL1A1
 Campomelic dysplasia with autosomal sex reversal; ; SOX9
 Campomelic dysplasia; ; SOX9
 Camptodactyly-arthropathy-coxa vara-pericarditis syndrome; ; PRG4
 Camurati–Engelmann disease; ; TGFB1
 Canavan disease; ; ASPA
 Candidiasis, familial chronic mucocutaneous, autosomal dominant; ; CLEC7A
 Candidiasis, familial chronic mucocutaneous, autosomal recessive; ; CARD9
 Capillary malformation-arteriovenous malformation; ; RASA1
 Carbamoyl phosphate synthetase I deficiency; ; CPS1
 Carbohydrate-deficient glycoprotein syndrome, type Ib; ; MPI
 Carboxypeptidase N deficiency; ; CPN1
 Carcinoid tumors, intestinal; ; SDHD
 Cardiac arrhythmia, ankyrin-B-related; ; ANK2
 Cardiac conduction defect, nonspecific; ; SCN1B
 Cardioencephalomyopathy, fatal infantile, due to cytochrome c oxidase deficiency; ; SCO2
 Cardiofaciocutaneous syndrome; ; BRAF
 Cardiofaciocutaneous syndrome; ; KRAS
 Cardiofaciocutaneous syndrome; ; MAP2K1
 Cardiofaciocutaneous syndrome; ; MAP2K2
 Cardiomyopathy, dilated 1C; ; LDB3
 Cardiomyopathy, dilated; ; MYBPC3
 Cardiomyopathy, dilated, 1A; ; LMNA
 Cardiomyopathy, dilated, 1AA; ; ACTN2
 Cardiomyopathy, dilated, 1BB; ; DSG2
 Cardiomyopathy, dilated, 1CC; ; NEXN
 Cardiomyopathy, dilated, 1D; ; TNNT2
 Cardiomyopathy, dilated, 1DD; ; RBM20
 Cardiomyopathy, dilated, 1E; ; SCN5A
 Cardiomyopathy, dilated, 1EE; ; MYH6
 Cardiomyopathy, dilated, 1FF; ; TNNI3
 Cardiomyopathy, dilated, 1G; ; TTN
 Cardiomyopathy, dilated, 1GG; ; SDHA
 Cardiomyopathy, dilated, 1I; ; DES
 Cardiomyopathy, dilated, 1J; ; EYA4
 Cardiomyopathy, dilated, 1L; ; SGCD
 Cardiomyopathy, dilated, 1M; ; CSRP3
 Cardiomyopathy, dilated, 1N; ; TCAP
 Cardiomyopathy, dilated, 1O; ; ABCC9
 Cardiomyopathy, dilated, 1P; ; PLN
 Cardiomyopathy, dilated, 1R; ; ACTC1
 Cardiomyopathy, dilated, 1S; ; MYH7
 Cardiomyopathy, dilated, 1W; ; VCL
 Cardiomyopathy, dilated, 1X; ; FKTN
 Cardiomyopathy, dilated, 1Y; ; TPM1
 Cardiomyopathy, dilated, 1Z; ; TNNC1
 Cardiomyopathy, dilated, 2A; ; TNNI3
 Cardiomyopathy, dilated, 3A; ; TAZ
 Cardiomyopathy, dilated, 3B; ; DMD
 Cardiomyopathy, familial hypertrophic, 1; ; MYH7
 Cardiomyopathy, familial hypertrophic, 10; ; MYL2
 Cardiomyopathy, familial hypertrophic, 11; ; ACTC1
 Cardiomyopathy, familial hypertrophic, 12; ; CSRP3
 Cardiomyopathy, familial hypertrophic, 13; ; TNNC1
 Cardiomyopathy, familial hypertrophic, 14; ; MYH6
 Cardiomyopathy, familial hypertrophic, 15; ; VCL
 Cardiomyopathy, familial hypertrophic; ; CAV3
 Cardiomyopathy, familial hypertrophic; ; SLC25A4
 Cardiomyopathy, familial hypertrophic, 2; ; TNNT2
 Cardiomyopathy, familial hypertrophic, 3; ; TPM1
 Cardiomyopathy, familial hypertrophic, 4; ; MYBPC3
 Cardiomyopathy, familial hypertrophic, 8; ; MYL3
 Cardiomyopathy, familial restrictive; ; TNNI3
 Cardiomyopathy, familial restrictive, 3; ; TNNT2
 Cardiomyopathy, hypertrophic 6, with WPW; ; PRKAG2
 Cardiomyopathy, hypertrophic, midventricular, digenic; ; MYLK2
 Carney complex variant; ; MYH8
 Carney complex, type 1; ; PRKAR1A
 Carnitine deficiency, systemic primary; ; SLC22A5
 Carotid intimal medial thickness 1; ; PPARG
 Carpal tunnel syndrome, familial; ; TTR
 Carpenter syndrome; ; RAB23
 Cartilage–hair hypoplasia; ; RMRP
 Cataract with late-onset corneal dystrophy; ; PAX6
 Cataract, autosomal dominant, multiple types 1; ; BFSP2
 Cataract, cerulean, type 2; ; CRYBB2
 Cataract, congenital nuclear, 2; ; CRYBB3
 Cataract, congenital nuclear, autosomal recessive 3; ; CRYBB1
 Cataract, congenital zonular, with sutural opacities; ; CRYBA1
 Cataract, congenital; ; BFSP2
 Cataract, congenital, cerulean type, 3; ; CRYGD
 Cataract, congenital, X-linked; ; NHS
 Cataract, Coppock-like; ; CRYBB2
 Cataract, Coppock-like; ; CRYGC
 Cataract, cortical, juvenile-onset; ; BFSP1
 Cataract, crystalline aculeiform; ; CRYGD
 Cataract, juvenile, with microcornea and glucosuria; ; SLC16A12
 Cataract, juvenile-onset; ; BFSP2
 Cataract, lamellar 2; ; CRYBA4
 Cataract, lamellar; ; HSF4
 Cataract, Marner type; ; HSF4
 Cataract, nonnuclear polymorphic congenital; ; CRYGD
 Cataract, polymorphic and lamellar; ; MIP
 Cataract, posterior polar, 1; ; EPHA2
 Cataract, posterior polar, 3; ; CHMP4B
 Cataract, posterior polar, 4; ; PITX3
 Cataract, posterior polar, 4, syndromic; ; PITX3
 Cataract, sutural, with punctate and cerulean opacities; ; CRYBB2
 Cataract, zonular pulverulent-1; ; GJA8
 Cataract, zonular pulverulent-3; ; GJA3
 Cataract-microcornea syndrome; ; GJA8
 CATSHL syndrome; ; FGFR3
 Caudal duplication anomaly; ; AXIN1
 Caudal regression syndrome; ; VANGL1
 Cavernous malformations of CNS and retina; ; CCM1
 CD59 deficiency; ; CD59
 CD8 deficiency, familial; ; CD8A
 Cenani–Lenz syndactyly syndrome; ; LRP4
 Central core disease; ; RYR1
 Central hypoventilation syndrome; ; GDNF
 Central hypoventilation syndrome, congenital; ; ASCL1
 Central hypoventilation syndrome, congenital; ; BDNF
 Central hypoventilation syndrome, congenital; ; EDN3
 Central hypoventilation syndrome, congenital; ; PMX2B
 Central hypoventilation syndrome, congenital; ; RET
 Cerebellar ataxia and mental retardation with or without quadrupedal locomotion 3; ; CA8
 Cerebellar ataxia; ; CP
 Cerebellar hypoplasia and mental retardation with or without quadrupedal locomotion 1; ; VLDLR
 Cerebral amyloid angiopathy; ; CST3
 Cerebral amyloid angiopathy, Dutch, Italian, Iowa, Flemish, Arctic variants; ; APP
 Cerebral arteriopathy with subcortical infarcts and leukoencephalopathy; ; NOTCH3
 Cerebral cavernous malformations 3; ; PDCD10
 Cerebral cavernous malformations-1; ; CCM1
 Cerebral cavernous malformations-2; ; C7orf22
 Cerebral dysgenesis, neuropathy, ichthyosis, and palmoplantar keratoderma syndrome; ; SNAP29
 Cerebral palsy, spastic quadriplegic, 3; ; AP4M1
 Cerebral palsy, spastic quadriplegic; ; KANK1
 Cerebral palsy, spastic, symmetric, autosomal recessive; ; GAD1
 Cerebrocostomandibular-like syndrome; ; COG1
 Cerebrooculofacioskeletal syndrome 1; ; ERCC6
 Cerebrooculofacioskeletal syndrome 2; ; ERCC2
 Cerebrooculofacioskeletal syndrome 4; ; ERCC1
 Cerebrotendinous xanthomatosis; ; CYP27A1
 Ceroid lipofuscinosis, neuronal 8; ; CLN8
 Ceroid lipofuscinosis, neuronal, 10; ; CTSD
 Ceroid lipofuscinosis, neuronal, 7; ; MFSD8
 Ceroid lipofuscinosis, neuronal, 8, Northern epilepsy variant; ; CLN8
 Ceroid lipofuscinosis, neuronal 1, infantile; ; PPT1
 Ceroid-lipofuscinosis, neuronal 2, classic late infantile; ; TPP1
 Ceroid lipofuscinosis, neuronal 3, juvenile; ; CLN3
 Ceroid-lipofuscinosis, neuronal-5, variant late infantile; ; CLN5
 Ceroid-lipofuscinosis, neuronal-6, variant late infantile; ; CLN6
 Cervical cancer, somatic; ; FGFR3
 Chanarin–Dorfman syndrome; ; ABHD5
 Char syndrome; ; TFAP2B
 Charcot–Marie–Tooth disease, axonal, type 2F; ; HSPB1
 Charcot–Marie–Tooth disease, axonal, type 2K; ; GDAP1
 Charcot–Marie–Tooth disease, axonal, type 2L; ; HSPB8
 Charcot–Marie–Tooth disease, axonal, type 2M; ; DNM2
 Charcot–Marie–Tooth disease, axonal, type 2N; ; AARS
 Charcot–Marie–Tooth disease, axonal, with vocal cord paresis; ; GDAP1
 Charcot–Marie–Tooth disease, dominant intermediate 3; ; MPZ
 Charcot–Marie–Tooth disease, dominant intermediate B; ; DNM2
 Charcot–Marie–Tooth disease, dominant intermediate C; ; YARS
 Charcot–Marie–Tooth disease, recessive intermediate, A; ; GDAP1
 Charcot–Marie–Tooth disease, recessive intermediate, B; ; KARS
 Charcot–Marie–Tooth disease type 1A; ; PMP22
 Charcot–Marie–Tooth disease type 1B; ; MPZ
 Charcot–Marie–Tooth disease type 1C; ; LITAF
 Charcot–Marie–Tooth disease type 1D; ; EGR2
 Charcot–Marie–Tooth disease type 1E; ; PMP22
 Charcot–Marie–Tooth disease type 1F; ; NEFL
 Charcot–Marie–Tooth disease type 2A1; ; KIF1B
 Charcot–Marie–Tooth disease type 2A2; ; MFN2
 Charcot–Marie–Tooth disease type 2B; ; RAB7
 Charcot–Marie–Tooth disease type 2B1; ; LMNA
 Charcot–Marie–Tooth disease type 2B2; ; MED25
 Charcot–Marie–Tooth disease type 2D; ; GARS
 Charcot–Marie–Tooth disease type 2E; ; NEFL
 Charcot–Marie–Tooth disease type 2I; ; MPZ
 Charcot–Marie–Tooth disease type 2J; ; MPZ
 Charcot–Marie–Tooth disease type 4A; ; GDAP1
 Charcot–Marie–Tooth disease type 4B1; ; MTMR2
 Charcot–Marie–Tooth disease type 4B2; ; SBF2
 Charcot–Marie–Tooth disease type 4C; ; SH3TC2
 Charcot–Marie–Tooth disease type 4D; ; NDRG1
 Charcot–Marie–Tooth disease type 4F; ; PRX
 Charcot–Marie–Tooth disease type 4H; ; FGD4
 Charcot–Marie–Tooth disease type 4J; ; FIG4
 Charcot–Marie–Tooth disease, X-linked recessive, 5; ; PRPS1
 Charcot–Marie–Tooth neuropathy, X-linked dominant, 1; ; GJB1
 CHARGE syndrome; ; CHD7
 CHARGE syndrome; ; SEMA3E
 Chédiak–Higashi syndrome; ; CHS1
 Cherubism; ; SH3BP2
 Chilblain lupus; ; TREX1
 CHILD syndrome; ; NSDHL
 Chloride diarrhea, congenital, Finnish type; ; SLC26A3
 Cholestasis, benign recurrent intrahepatic, 2; ; ABCB11
 Cholestasis, benign recurrent intrahepatic; ; ATP8B1
 Cholestasis, familial intrahepatic, of pregnancy; ; ABCB4
 Cholestasis, progressive familial intrahepatic 1; ; ATP8B1
 Cholestasis, progressive familial intrahepatic 2; ; ABCB11
 Cholestasis, progressive familial intrahepatic 3; ; ABCB4
 Cholestasis, progressive familial intrahepatic 4; ; HSD3B7
 Cholesteryl ester storage disease; ; LIPA
 Chondrocalcinosis 2; ; ANKH
 Chondrodysplasia punctata, rhizomelic, type 2; ; GNPAT
 Chondrodysplasia punctata, X-linked dominant; ; EBP
 Chondrodysplasia punctata, X-linked recessive; ; ARSE
 Chondrodysplasia, Blomstrand type; ; PTHR1
 Chondrodysplasia, Grebe type; ; GDF5
 Chondrosarcoma; ; EXT1
 Chondrosarcoma, extraskeletal myxoid; ; TAF15
 Chondrosarcoma, extraskeletal myxoid; ; TFG
 Chondrosarcoma, extraskeletal myxoid; ; CSMF
 Chorea, hereditary benign; ; NKX2-1
 Choreoacanthocytosis; ; VPS13A
 Choreoathetosis, hypothyroidism, and neonatal respiratory distress; ; NKX2-1
 Choriodal dystrophy, central areolar 2; ; PRPH2
 Choroid plexus papilloma; ; TP53
 Choroideremia; ; CHM
 Chromosome 22q13.3 deletion syndrome; ; SHANK3
 Chromosome 5q14.3 deletion syndrome; ; MEF2C
 Chrondrodysplasia, acromesomelic, with genital anomalies; ; BMPR1B
 Chronic granulomatous disease due to deficiency of NCF-1; ; NCF1
 Chronic granulomatous disease due to deficiency of NCF-2; ; NCF2
 Chronic granulomatous disease, autosomal, due to deficiency of CYBA; ; CYBA
 Chronic granulomatous disease, X-linked; ; CYBB
 Chylomicron retention disease; ; SAR1B
 Ciliary dyskinesia, primary, 1, with or without situs inversus; ; DNAI1
 Ciliary dyskinesia, primary, 10; ; KTU
 Ciliary dyskinesia, primary, 11; ; RSPH4A
 Ciliary dyskinesia, primary, 12; ; RSPH9
 Ciliary dyskinesia, primary, 13; ; LRRC50
 Ciliary dyskinesia, primary, 3, with or without situs inversus; ; DNAH5
 Ciliary dyskinesia, primary, 6; ; TXNDC3
 Ciliary dyskinesia, primary, 7, with or without situs inversus; ; DNAH11
 Ciliary dyskinesia, primary, 9, with or without situs inversus; ; DNAI2
 CINCA syndrome; ; NLRP3
 Cirrhosis, North American Indian childhood type; ; CIRH1A
 Citrullinemia; ; ASS1
 Citrullinemia, adult-onset type II; ; SLC25A13
 Citrullinemia, type II, neonatal-onset; ; SLC25A13
 Cleft lip/palate-ectodermal dysplasia syndrome; ; HVEC
 Cleft palate and mental retardation; ; SATB2
 Cleft palate with ankyloglossia; ; TBX22
 Cleft palate, isolated; ; UBB
 Cleidocranial dysplasia; ; RUNX2
 C-like syndrome; ; CD96
 Clopidogrel, impaired responsiveness to; ; CYP2C
 Clubfoot, congenital; ; PITX1
 COACH syndrome; ; CC2D2A
 COACH syndrome; ; RPGRIP1L
 COACH syndrome; ; TMEM67
 Cockayne syndrome type A; ; ERCC8
 Cockayne syndrome type B; ; ERCC6
 Cocoon syndrome; ; CHUK
 Coenzyme Q10 deficiency; ; APTX
 Coenzyme Q10 deficiency; ; CABC1
 Coenzyme Q10 deficiency; ; COQ2
 Coenzyme Q10 deficiency; ; COQ9
 Coenzyme Q10 deficiency; ; PDSS1
 Coenzyme Q10 deficiency; ; PDSS2
 Coffin–Lowry syndrome; ; RPS6KA3
 Cohen syndrome; ; COH1
 Cold-induced autoinflammatory syndrome, familial; ; NLRP3
 Cold-induced sweating syndrome 1; ; CLCF1
 Cold-induced sweating syndrome; ; CRLF1
 Coloboma of optic nerve; ; PAX6
 Coloboma, ocular; ; PAX6
 Coloboma, ocular; ; SHH
 Colon cancer, somatic; ; PTPRJ
 Colorblindness, deutan; ; OPN1MW
 Colorblindness, tritan; ; OPN1SW
 Colorectal adenomatous polyposis, autosomal recessive, with pilomatricomas; ; MUTYH
 Colorectal cancer; ; AXIN2
 Colorectal cancer; ; BUB1B
 Colorectal cancer; ; EP300
 Colorectal cancer; ; NRAS
 Colorectal cancer; ; PDGFRL
 Colorectal cancer; ; TP53
 Colorectal cancer, hereditary nonpolyposis, type 1; ; MSH2
 Colorectal cancer, hereditary nonpolyposis, type 2; ; MLH1
 Colorectal cancer, hereditary nonpolyposis, type I; ; EPCAM
 Colorectal cancer, somatic; ; FGFR3
 Colorectal cancer, somatic; ; AKT1
 Colorectal cancer, somatic; ; APC
 Colorectal cancer, somatic; ; FLCN
 Colorectal cancer, somatic; ; MLH3
 Colorectal cancer, somatic; ; PIK3CA
 Combined cellular and humoral immune defects with granulomas; ; RAG1
 Combined cellular and humoral immune defects with granulomas; ; RAG2
 Combined factor V and VIII deficiency; ; LMAN1
 Combined hyperlipidemia, familial; ; LPL
 Combined immunodeficiency, X-linked, moderate; ; IL2RG
 Combined malonic and methylmalonic aciduria (CMAMMA); 614265; ACSF3
 Combined malonic and methylmalonic aciduria (CMAMMA); 248360; MLYCD
 Combined oxidative phosphorylation deficiency 1; ; GFM1
 Combined oxidative phosphorylation deficiency 2; ; MRPS16
 Combined oxidative phosphorylation deficiency 3; ; TSFM
 Combined oxidative phosphorylation deficiency 4; ; TUFM
 Combined oxidative phosphorylation deficiency 5; ; MRPS22
 Combined oxidative phosphorylation deficiency 6; ; AIFM1
 Combined SAP deficiency; ; PSAP
 Complement component 4, partial deficiency of; ; C1NH
 Complement factor H deficiency; ; HF1
 Complement factor I deficiency; ; CFI
 Complex I, mitochondrial respiratory chain, deficiency of; ; NDUFS6
 Cone dystrophy 4; ; PDE6C
 Cone dystrophy-3; ; GUCA1A
 Cone–rod dystrophy 10; ; SEMA4A
 Cone–rod dystrophy 11; ; RAXL1
 Cone–rod dystrophy 12; ; PROM1
 Cone–rod dystrophy 13; ; RPGRIP1
 Cone–rod dystrophy 14; ; GUCA1A
 Cone–rod dystrophy 15; ; CDHR1
 Cone–rod dystrophy 3; ; ABCA4
 Cone–rod dystrophy 5; ; PITPNM3
 Cone–rod dystrophy; ; GUCY2D
 Cone–rod dystrophy 7; ; RIMS1
 Cone–rod dystrophy 9; ; ADAM9
 Cone–rod dystrophy, X-linked, 3; ; CACNA1F
 Cone–rod dystrophy-1; ; RPGR
 Cone–rod retinal dystrophy-2; ; CRX
 Congenital bilateral absence of vas deferens; ; CFTR
 Congenital cataracts, facial dysmorphism, and neuropathy; ; CTDP1
 Congenital disorder of glycosylation, type Ia; ; PMM2
 Congenital disorder of glycosylation, type Ic; ; ALG6
 Congenital disorder of glycosylation, type Id; ; ALG3
 Congenital disorder of glycosylation, type Ie; ; DPM1
 Congenital disorder of glycosylation, type If; ; MPDU1
 Congenital disorder of glycosylation, type Ig; ; ALG12
 Congenital disorder of glycosylation, type Ih; ; ALG8
 Congenital disorder of glycosylation, type Ii; ; ALG2
 Congenital disorder of glycosylation, type IIA; ; MGAT2
 Congenital disorder of glycosylation, type IIb; ; GCS1
 Congenital disorder of glycosylation type IIc; ; SLC35C1
 Congenital disorder of glycosylation, type IId; ; B4GALT1
 Congenital disorder of glycosylation, type IIe; ; COG7
 Congenital disorder of glycosylation, type IIf; ; SLC35A1
 Congenital disorder of glycosylation, type IIg; ; COG1
 Congenital disorder of glycosylation, type IIh; ; COG8
 Congenital disorder of glycosylation, type IIj; ; COG4
 Congenital disorder of glycosylation, type Ij; ; DPAGT2
 Congenital disorder of glycosylation, type Ik; ; ALG1
 Congenital disorder of glycosylation, type Il; ; ALG9
 Congenital disorder of glycosylation, type Im; ; TMEM15
 Congenital disorder of glycosylation, type In; ; RFT1
 Congenital disorder of glycosylation, type Io; ; DPM3
 Congenital disorder of glycosylation, type Ip; ; SRD5A3
 Congenital heart defects, nonsyndromic, 1, X-linked; ; ZIC3
 Congenital heart disease, nonsyndromic, 2; ; TAB2
 Conjunctivitis, ligneous; ; PLG
 Conotruncal anomaly face syndrome; ; TBX1
 Contractural arachnodactyly, congenital; ; FBN2
 Convulsions, benign familial infantile, 3; ; SCN2A1
 Convulsions, familial febrile, 4; ; GPR98
 COPD, rate of decline of lung function in; ; MMP1
 Coproporphyria; ; CPOX
 Cornea plana congenita, recessive; ; KERA
 Corneal dystrophy polymorphous posterior, 2; ; COL8A2
 Corneal dystrophy, Avellino type; ; TGFBI
 Corneal dystrophy, congenital stromal; ; DCN
 Corneal dystrophy, crystalline, of Schnyder; ; UBIAD1
 Corneal dystrophy, epithelial basement membrane; ; TGFBI
 Corneal dystrophy, Fuchs endothelial, 1; ; COL8A2
 Corneal dystrophy, Fuchs endothelial, 4; ; SLC4A11
 Corneal dystrophy, Fuchs endothelial, 6; ; ZEB1
 Corneal dystrophy, gelatinous drop-like; ; TACSTD2
 Corneal dystrophy, Groenouw type I; ; TGFBI
 Corneal dystrophy, hereditary polymorphous posterior; ; VSX1
 Corneal dystrophy, lattice type I; ; TGFBI
 Corneal dystrophy, lattice type IIIA; ; TGFBI
 Corneal dystrophy, posterior polymorphous, 3; ; ZEB1
 Corneal dystrophy, Reis-Bucklers type; ; TGFBI
 Corneal dystrophy, Thiel-Behnke type; ; TGFBI
 Corneal endothelial dystrophy 2; ; SLC4A11
 Corneal endothelial dystrophy and perceptive deafness; ; SLC4A11
 Corneal fleck dystrophy; ; PIKFYVE
 Cornelia de Lange syndrome 1; ; NIPBL
 Cornelia de Lange syndrome 2; ; DXS423E
 Cornelia de Lange syndrome 3; ; CSPG6
 Corpus callosum, agenesis of, with mental retardation, ocular coloboma and micrognathia; ; IGBP1
 Corpus callosum, partial agenesis of; ; L1CAM
 Cortical dysplasia-focal epilepsy syndrome; ; CNTNAP2
 Corticosteroid-binding globulin deficiency; ; CBG
 Cortisone reductase deficiency; ; H6PD
 Cortisone reductase deficiency; ; HSD11B1
 Costello syndrome; ; HRAS
 Coumarin resistance; ; CYP2A6
 Cousin syndrome; ; TBX15
 Cowden syndrome; ; PTEN
 Cowden-like syndrome; ; SDHB
 Cowden-like syndrome; ; SDHD
 CPT deficiency, hepatic, type IA; ; CPT1A
 CPT deficiency, hepatic, type II; ; CPT2
 CPT II deficiency, lethal neonatal; ; CPT2
 Cranioectodermal dysplasia; ; IFT122
 Craniofacial-deafness-hand syndrome; ; PAX3
 Craniofrontonasal dysplasia; ; EFNB1
 Cranio-lenticulo-sutural dysplasia; ; SEC23A
 Craniometaphyseal dysplasia; ; ANKH
 Cranioosteoarthropathy; ; HPGD
 Craniosynostosis, type 1; ; TWIST1
 Craniosynostosis, type 2; ; MSX2
 CRASH syndrome; ; L1CAM
 Creatine deficiency syndrome, X-linked; ; SLC6A8
 Creatine phosphokinase, elevated serum; ; CAV3
 Creutzfeldt–Jakob disease; ; PRNP
 Crigler–Najjar syndrome type I; ; UGT1A1
 Crigler–Najjar syndrome type II; ; UGT1A1
 Crisponi syndrome; ; CRLF1
 Crouzon syndrome with acanthosis nigricans; ; FGFR3
 Crouzon syndrome; ; FGFR2
 Cryptorchidism, bilateral; ; LGR8
 Cryptorchidism, idiopathic; ; INSL3
 Currarino syndrome; ; MNX1
 Cutis laxa with severe pulmonary, gastrointestinal, and urinary abnormalities; ; LTBP4
 Cutis laxa, AD; ; ELN
 Cutis laxa, autosomal dominant; ; FBLN5
 Cutis laxa, autosomal recessive; ; FBLN5
 Cutis laxa, autosomal recessive, type I; ; EFEMP2
 Cutis laxa, autosomal recessive, type II; ; ATP6V0A2
 Cutis laxa, autosomal recessive, type IIB; ; PYCR1
 Cutis laxa, recessive, type I; ; LOX
 Cylindromatosis, familial; ; CYLD1
 Cystathioninuria; ; CTH
 Cystic fibrosis; ; CFTR
 Cystinosis, late-onset juvenile or adolescent nephropathic; ; CTNS
 Cystinosis, nephropathic; ; CTNS
 Cystinosis, ocular nonnephropathic; ; CTNS
 Cystinuria; ; SLC3A1
 Cystinuria; ; SLC7A9
 Cytochrome C oxidase deficiency; ; COX6B1
 D-2-hydroxyglutaric aciduria; ; D2HGDH
 Dandy–Walker malformation; ; ZIC1
 Dandy–Walker malformation; ; ZIC4
 Darier disease; ; ATP2A2
 Darsun syndrome; ; G6PC3
 D-bifunctional protein deficiency; ; HSD17B4
 De la Chapelle dysplasia; ; SLC26A2
 De Sanctis–Cacchione syndrome; ; ERCC6
 Deafness, autosomal dominant 1; ; DIAPH1
 Deafness, autosomal dominant 10; ; EYA4
 Deafness, autosomal dominant 11, neurosensory; ; MYO7A
 Deafness, autosomal dominant 13; ; COL11A2
 Deafness, autosomal dominant 15; ; POU4F3
 Deafness, autosomal dominant 17; ; MYH9
 Deafness, autosomal dominant 20/26; ; ACTG1
 Deafness, autosomal dominant 22; ; MYO6
 Deafness, autosomal dominant 23; ; SIX1
 Deafness, autosomal dominant 25; ; SLC17A8
 Deafness, autosomal dominant 28; ; GRHL2
 Deafness, autosomal dominant 2A; ; KCNQ4
 Deafness, autosomal dominant 2B; ; GJB3
 Deafness, autosomal dominant 36; ; TMC1
 Deafness, autosomal dominant 36, with dentinogenesis; ; DSPP
 Deafness, autosomal dominant 3A; ; GJB2
 Deafness, autosomal dominant 3B; ; GJB6
 Deafness, autosomal dominant 4; ; MYH14
 Deafness, autosomal dominant 44; ; CCDC50
 Deafness, autosomal dominant 48; ; MYO1A
 Deafness, autosomal dominant 5; ; DFNA5
 Deafness, autosomal dominant 50; ; MIR96
 Deafness, autosomal dominant 8/12; ; TECTA
 Deafness, autosomal dominant 9; ; COCH
 Deafness, autosomal recessive 10, congenital; ; TMPRSS3
 Deafness, autosomal recessive 12; ; CDH23
 Deafness, autosomal recessive 16; ; STRC
 Deafness, autosomal recessive 18; ; USH1C
 Deafness, autosomal recessive 1A; ; GJB2
 Deafness, autosomal recessive 1B; ; GJB6
 Deafness, autosomal recessive 2, neurosensory; ; MYO7A
 Deafness, autosomal recessive 21; ; TECTA
 Deafness, autosomal recessive 22; ; OTOA
 Deafness, autosomal recessive 23; ; PCDH15
 Deafness, autosomal recessive 25; ; GRXCR1
 Deafness, autosomal recessive 28; ; TRIOBP
 Deafness, autosomal recessive 3; ; MYO15A
 Deafness, autosomal recessive 30; ; MYO3A
 Deafness, autosomal recessive 31; ; WHRN
 Deafness, autosomal recessive 35; ; ESRRB
 Deafness, autosomal recessive 36; ; ESPN
 Deafness, autosomal recessive 37; ; MYO6
 Deafness, autosomal recessive 39; ; HGF
 Deafness, autosomal recessive 49; ; MARVELD2
 Deafness, autosomal recessive 53; ; COL11A2
 Deafness, autosomal recessive 59; ; PJVK
 Deafness, autosomal recessive 6; ; TMIE
 Deafness, autosomal recessive 63; ; LRTOMT
 Deafness, autosomal recessive 67; ; LHFPL5
 Deafness, autosomal recessive 7; ; TMC1
 Deafness, autosomal recessive 77; ; LOXHD1
 Deafness, autosomal recessive 79; ; TPRN
 Deafness, autosomal recessive 8, childhood onset; ; TMPRSS3
 Deafness, autosomal recessive 84; ; PTPRQ
 Deafness, autosomal recessive 9; ; OTOF
 Deafness, autosomal recessive 91; ; SERPINB6
 Deafness, autosomal recessive, 24; ; RDX
 Deafness, congenital with inner ear agenesis, microtia, and microdontia; ; FGF3
 Deafness, digenic GJB2/GJB6; ; GJB6
 Deafness, digenic, GJB2/GJB3; ; GJB3
 Deafness, sensorineural, with hypertrophic cardiomyopathy; ; MYO6
 Deafness, X-linked 1; ; PRPS1
 Deafness, X-linked 2; ; POU3F4
 Dehydrated hereditary stomatocytosis, pseudohyperkalemia, and perinatal edema; ; PIEZO1
 Dejerine–Sottas disease; ; PMP22
 Dejerine–Sottas neuropathy; ; EGR2
 Dejerine–Sottas neuropathy, autosomal recessive; ; PRX
 Dejerine–Sottas syndrome; ; MPZ
 Dementia, familial British; ; ITM2B
 Dementia, familial Danish; ; ITM2B
 Dementia, familial, nonspecific; ; CHMP2B
 Dementia, frontotemporal; ; PSEN1
 Dementia, frontotemporal, with or without parkinsonism; ; MAPT
 Dementia, Lewy body; ; SNCA
 Dementia, Lewy body; ; SNCB
 Dent's disease 2; ; OCRL
 Dent's disease; ; CLCN5
 Dentatorubr–pallidoluysian atrophy; ; ATN1
 Dentin dysplasia, type II; ; DSPP
 Dentinogenesis imperfecta, Shields type II; ; DSPP
 Dentinogenesis imperfecta, Shields type III; ; DSPP
 Denys–Drash syndrome; ; WT1
 Dermatopathia pigmentosa reticularis; ; KRT14
 Desbuquois dysplasia; ; CANT1
 Desmoid disease, hereditary; ; APC
 Desmosterolosis; ; DHCR24
 Diabetes insipidus, nephrogenic; ; AQP2
 Diabetes insipidus, nephrogenic; ; AVPR2
 Diabetes insipidus, neurohypophyseal; ; AVP
 Diabetes mellitus, gestational; ; GCK
 Diabetes mellitus, insulin-dependent, 2; ; INS
 Diabetes mellitus, insulin-dependent, 20; ; HNF1A
 Diabetes mellitus, insulin-resistant, with acanthosis nigricans; ; INSR
 Diabetes mellitus, ketosis-prone; ; PAX4
 Diabetes mellitus, neonatal, with congenital hypothyroidism; ; GLIS3
 Diabetes mellitus, noninsulin-dependent; ; ABCC8
 Diabetes mellitus, noninsulin-dependent; ; HNF1B
 Diabetes mellitus, noninsulin-dependent, late onset; ; GCK
 Diabetes mellitus, permanent neonatal; ; ABCC8
 Diabetes mellitus, permanent neonatal; ; GCK
 Diabetes mellitus, permanent neonatal; ; INS
 Diabetes mellitus, permanent neonatal, with cerebellar agenesis; ; PTF1A
 Diabetes mellitus, permanent neonatal, with neurologic features; ; KCNJ11
 Diabetes mellitus, transient neonatal 2; ; ABCC8
 Diabetes mellitus, transient neonatal, 1; ; ZFP57
 Diabetes mellitus, transient neonatal, 3; ; KCNJ11
 Diabetes mellitus, type 1; ; INS
 Diabetes mellitus, type 2; ; PAX4
 Diabetes mellitus type II; ; AKT2
 Diabetes, permanent neonatal; ; KCNJ11
 Diamond–Blackfan anemia 1; ; RPS19
 Diamond–Blackfan anemia 10; ; RPS26
 Diamond-Blackfan anemia 4; ; RPS17
 Diamond–Blackfan anemia 5; ; RPL35A
 Diamond–Blackfan anemia 6; ; RPL5
 Diamond–Blackfan anemia 7; ; RPL11
 Diamond–Blackfan anemia 8; ; RPS7
 Diamond–Blackfan anemia 9; ; RPS10
 Diamond–Blackfan anemia; ; RPS24
 Diaphragmatic hernia 3; ; ZFPM2
 Diarrhea 3, secretory sodium, congenital, syndromic; ; SPINT2
 Diarrhea 4, malabsorptive, congenital; ; NEUROG3
 Diarrhea 5, with tufting enteropathy, congenital; ; EPCAM
 Diastrophic dysplasia; ; SLC26A2
 Diastrophic dysplasia, broad bone-platyspondylic variant; ; SLC26A2
 Dicarboxylic aminoaciduria; ; SLC1A1
 DiGeorge syndrome; ; TBX1
 Digital clubbing, isolated congenital; ; HPGD
 Dihydropyrimidine dehydrogenase deficiency; ; DPYD
 Dihydropyrimidinuria; ; DPYS
 Dilated cardiomyopathy with woolly hair and keratoderma; ; DSP
 Dimethylglycine dehydrogenase deficiency; ; DMGDH
 Disordered steroidogenesis, isolated; ; POR
 Donnai–Barrow syndrome; ; LRP2
 Dopamine beta-hydroxylase deficiency; ; DBH
 Dosage-sensitive sex reversal; ; DAX1
 Double outlet right ventricle; ; CFC1
 Double outlet right ventricle; ; GDF1
 Dowling–Degos disease; ; KRT5
 Doyne honeycomb degeneration of retina; ; EFEMP1
 Dravet syndrome; ; SCN1A
 Duane retraction syndrome 2; ; CHN1
 Duane-radial ray syndrome; ; SALL4
 Dubin–Johnson syndrome; ; ABCC2
 Duchenne muscular dystrophy; ; DMD
 Dyggve–Melchior–Clausen disease; ; DYM
 Dysautonomia, familial; ; IKBKAP
 Dyschromatosis symmetrica hereditaria; ; ADAR
 Dyserythropoietic anemia with thrombocytopenia; ; GATA1
 Dyskeratosis congenita; ; TERT
 Dyskeratosis congenita; ; NOLA2
 Dyskeratosis congenita, autosomal dominant; ; TERC
 Dyskeratosis congenita, autosomal dominant; ; TINF2
 Dyskeratosis congenita, autosomal recessive; ; NOLA3
 Dyskeratosis congenita-1; ; DKC1
 Dyssegmental dysplasia, Silverman-Handmaker type; ; HSPG2
 Dystonia 16; ; PRKRA
 Dystonia 6, torsion; ; THAP1
 Dystonia, dopa-responsive, due to sepiapterin reductase deficiency; ; SPR
 Dystonia, DOPA-responsive, with or without hyperphenylalainemia; ; GCH1
 Dystonia, juvenile-onset; ; ACTB
 Dystonia, myoclonic; ; DRD2
 Dystonia-1, torsion; ; DYT1
 Dystonia-11, myoclonic; ; SGCE
 Dystonia-12; ; ATP1A3
 Dystonia-parkinsonism, adult-onset; ; PLA2G6
 Dystonia-Parkinsonism, X-linked; ; TAF1
 EBD inversa; ; COL7A1
 EBD, Bart type; ; COL7A1
 Ectodermal dysplasia, anhidrotic, autosomal dominant; ; EDARADD
 Ectodermal dysplasia, anhidrotic, autosomal recessive; ; EDARADD
 Ectodermal dysplasia, anhidrotic, with T-cell immunodeficiency; ; NFKBIA
 Ectodermal dysplasia, anhidrotic, X-linked; ; ED1
 Ectodermal dysplasia, ectrodactyly, and macular dystrophy; ; CDH3
 Ectodermal dysplasia, hidrotic; ; GJB6
 Ectodermal dysplasia, hypohidrotic, autosomal dominant; ; EDAR
 Ectodermal dysplasia, hypohidrotic, autosomal recessive; ; EDAR
 Ectodermal dysplasia, hypohidrotic, with immune deficiency; ; IKBKG
 Ectodermal dysplasia, 'pure' hair-nail type; ; KRT85
 Ectodermal dysplasia-skin fragility syndrome; ; PKP1
 Ectodermal dysplasia-syndactyly syndrome 1; ; PVRL4
 Ectodermal, dysplasia, anhidrotic, lymphedema and immunodeficiency; ; IKBKG
 Ectopia lentis, familial; ; FBN1
 Ectopia lentis, isolated, autosomal recessive; ; ADAMTSL4
 Ectrodactyly, ectodermal dysplasia, and cleft lip/palate syndrome 3; ; TP63
 Ehlers–Danlos due to tenascin X deficiency; ; TNXB
 Ehlers–Danlos syndrome, cardiac valvular form; ; COL1A2
 Ehlers–Danlos syndrome, hypermobility type; ; TNXB
 Ehlers-Danlos syndrome, musculocontractural type; ; CHST14
 Ehlers–Danlos syndrome, progeroid form; ; B4GALT7
 Ehlers–Danlos syndrome, type I; ; COL1A1
 Ehlers–Danlos syndrome, type I; ; COL5A1
 Ehlers–Danlos syndrome, type I; ; COL5A2
 Ehlers–Danlos syndrome, type II; ; COL5A1
 Ehlers–Danlos syndrome, type III; ; COL3A1
 Ehlers–Danlos syndrome, type IV; ; COL3A1
 Ehlers–Danlos syndrome, type VI; ; PLOD
 Ehlers–Danlos syndrome, type VIIA; ; COL1A1
 Ehlers–Danlos syndrome, type VIIB; ; COL1A2
 Ehlers–Danlos syndrome, type VIIC; ; ADAMTS2
 Eiken syndrome; ; PTHR1
 Elliptocytosis-1; ; EPB41
 Elliptocytosis-2; ; SPTA1
 Ellis–van Creveld syndrome; ; EVC
 Ellis–van Creveld syndrome; ; LBN
 Emery–Dreifuss muscular dystrophy 4; ; SYNE1
 Emery–Dreifuss muscular dystrophy 5; ; SYNE2
 Emery–Dreifuss muscular dystrophy 6; ; FHL1
 Emery–Dreifuss muscular dystrophy; ; EMD
 Emery–Dreifuss muscular dystrophy, AD; ; LMNA
 Emery–Dreifuss muscular dystrophy, AR; ; LMNA
 Emphysema due to AAT deficiency; ; SERPINA1
 Emphysema-cirrhosis, due to AAT deficiency; ; SERPINA1
 Encephalocardiomyopathy, neonatal, mitochondrial, due to ATP synthase deficiency; ; TMEM70
 Encephalopathy, familial, with neuroserpin inclusion bodies; ; SERPINI1
 Encephalopathy, neonatal severe; ; MECP2
 Endocrine-cerebroosteodysplasia; ; ICK
 Endometrial cancer; ; MLH3
 Endometrial cancer, familial; ; MSH6
 Endplate acetylcholinesterase deficiency; ; COLQ
 Enhanced S-cone syndrome; ; NR2E3
 Enlarged vestibular aqueduct; ; FOXI1
 Enlarged vestibular aqueduct; ; SLC26A4
 Enterokinase deficiency; ; PRSS7
 Eosinophil peroxidase deficiency; ; EPX
 Epidermodysplasia verruciformis; ; TMC6
 Epidermodysplasia verruciformis; ; TMC8
 Epidermolysis bullosa dystrophica, AD; ; COL7A1
 Epidermolysis bullosa dystrophica, AR; ; COL7A1
 Epidermolysis bullosa of hands and feet; ; ITGB4
 Epidermolysis bullosa pruriginosa; ; COL7A1
 Epidermolysis bullosa simplex with migratory circinate erythema; ; KRT5
 Epidermolysis bullosa simplex with mottled pigmentation; ; KRT5
 Epidermolysis bullosa simplex with pyloric atresia; ; PLEC1
 Epidermolysis bullosa simplex, Dowling-Meara type; ; KRT14
 Epidermolysis bullosa simplex, Dowling-Meara type; ; KRT5
 Epidermolysis bullosa simplex, Koebner type; ; KRT14
 Epidermolysis bullosa simplex, Koebner type; ; KRT5
 Epidermolysis bullosa simplex, Ogna type; ; PLEC1
 Epidermolysis bullosa simplex, recessive; ; KRT14
 Epidermolysis bullosa simplex, Weber-Cockayne type; ; KRT14
 Epidermolysis bullosa simplex, Weber-Cockayne type; ; KRT5
 Epidermolysis bullosa, generalized atrophic benign; ; LAMA3
 Epidermolysis bullosa, junctional, Herlitz type; ; LAMA3
 Epidermolysis bullosa, junctional, Herlitz type; ; LAMB3
 Epidermolysis bullosa, junctional, Herlitz type; ; LAMC2
 Epidermolysis bullosa, junctional, non-Herlitz type; ; COL17A1
 Epidermolysis bullosa, junctional, non-Herlitz type; ; ITGB4
 Epidermolysis bullosa, junctional, non-Herlitz type; ; LAMB3
 Epidermolysis bullosa, junctional, non-Herlitz type; ; LAMC2
 Epidermolysis bullosa, junctional, with pyloric atresia; ; ITGB4
 Epidermolysis bullosa, junctional, with pyloric stenosis; ; ITGA6
 Epidermolysis bullosa, lethal acantholytic; ; DSP
 Epidermolysis bullosa, pretibial; ; COL7A1
 Epidermolytic hyperkeratosis; ; KRT1
 Epidermolytic hyperkeratosis; ; KRT10
 Epidermolytic palmoplantar keratoderma; ; KRT9
 Epilepsy, benign neonatal, type 2; ; KCNQ3
 Epilepsy, benign, neonatal, type 1; ; KCNQ2
 Epilepsy, female-restricted, with mental retardation; ; PCDH19
 Epilepsy, generalized, with febrile seizures plus, type 2; ; SCN1A
 Epilepsy, generalized, with febrile seizures plus, type 3; ; GABRG2
 Epilepsy, juvenile myoclonic, susceptibility to; ; GABRD
 Epilepsy, myoclonic, Lafora type; ; EPM2A
 Epilepsy, myoclonic, Lafora type; ; NHLRC1
 Epilepsy, myoclonic, with mental retardation and spasticity; ; ARX
 Epilepsy, neonatal myoclonic, with suppression-burst pattern; ; SLC25A22
 Epilepsy, nocturnal frontal lobe, 1; ; CHRNA4
 Epilepsy, nocturnal frontal lobe, 3; ; CHRNB2
 Epilepsy, nocturnal frontal lobe, type 4; ; CHRNA2
 Epilepsy, partial, with auditory features; ; LGI1
 Epilepsy, progressive myoclonic 1; ; CSTB
 Epilepsy, progressive myoclonic 1B; ; PRICKLE1
 Epilepsy, progressive myoclonic 2B; ; NHLRC1
 Epilepsy, progressive myoclonic 3; ; KCTD7
 Epilepsy, pyridoxine-dependent; ; ALDH7A1
 Epilepsy, severe myoclonic, of infancy; ; SCN1A
 Epilepsy, X-linked, with variable learning disabilities and behavior disorders; ; SYN1
 Epileptic encephalopathy, early infantile, 1; ; ARX
 Epileptic encephalopathy, early infantile, 2; ; CDKL5
 Epileptic encephalopathy, early infantile, 4; ; STXBP1
 Epileptic encephalopathy, early infantile, 5; ; SPTAN1
 Epileptic encephalopathy, Lennox-Gastaut type; ; MAPK10
 Epiphyseal dysplasia, multiple 1; ; COMP
 Epiphyseal dysplasia, multiple, 2; ; COL9A2
 Epiphyseal dysplasia, multiple, 3; ; COL9A3
 Epiphyseal dysplasia, multiple, 4; ; SLC26A2
 Epiphyseal dysplasia, multiple, 5; ; MATN3
 Epiphyseal dysplasia, multiple, with myopia and deafness; ; COL2A1
 Episodic ataxia, type 2; ; CACNA1A
 Episodic ataxia, type 6; ; SLC1A3
 Episodic ataxia/myokymia syndrome; ; KCNA1
 Epstein syndrome; ; MYH9
 Erythermalgia, primary; ; SCN9A
 Erythrocyte lactate transporter defect; ; SLC16A1
 Erythrocytosis, familial, 3; ; EGLN1
 Erythrocytosis, familial, 4; ; EPAS1
 Erythrokeratodermia variabilis et progressiva; ; GJB3
 Erythrokeratodermia variabilis with erythema gyratum repens; ; GJB4
 Escobar syndrome; ; CHRNG
 Esophageal cancer; ; DLEC1
 Esophageal cancer, somatic; ; TGFBR2
 Esophageal carcinoma, somatic; ; RNF6
 Esophageal squamous cell carcinoma; ; 40513
 Esophageal squamous cell carcinoma; ; LZTS1
 Esophageal squamous cell carcinoma; ; WWOX
 Ethylmalonic encephalopathy; ; ETHE1
 Ewing sarcoma; ; EWSR1
 Exocrine pancreatic insufficiency, dyserythropoietic anemia, and calvarial hyperostosis; ; COX4I2
 Exostoses, multiple, type 1; ; EXT1
 Exostoses, multiple, type 2; ; EXT2
 Exudative vitreoretinopathy 4; ; LRP5
 Exudative vitreoretinopathy 5; ; TSPAN12
 Exudative vitreoretinopathy; ; FZD4
 Exudative vitreoretinopathy, X-linked; ; NDP
 Fabry disease; ; GLA
 Fabry disease, cardiac variant; ; GLA
 Factor V and factor VIII, combined deficiency of; ; MCFD2
 Factor V deficiency; ; F5
 Factor XI deficiency, autosomal dominant; ; F11
 Factor XI deficiency, autosomal recessive; ; F11
 Factor XII deficiency; ; F12
 Factor XIIIA deficiency; ; F13A1
 Factor XIIIB deficiency; ; F13B
 Failure of tooth eruption, primary; ; PTHR1
 Familial cold autoinflammatory syndrome 2; ; NALP12
 Familial Mediterranean fever, AD; ; MEFV
 Familial Mediterranean fever, AR; ; MEFV
 Fanconi anemia, complementation group 0; ; RAD51C
 Fanconi anemia, complementation group A; ; FANCA
 Fanconi anemia, complementation group B; ; FAAP95
 Fanconi anemia, complementation group D1; ; BRCA2
 Fanconi anemia, complementation group I; ; FANCI
 Fanconi anemia, complementation group J; ; BRIP1
 Fanconi anemia, complementation group N; ; PALB2
 Fanconi renotubular syndrome 2; ; SLC34A1
 Fanconi–Bickel syndrome; ; SLC2A2
 Farber lipogranulomatosis; ; ASAH1
 Fatty liver, acute, of pregnancy; ; HADHA
 Febrile convulsions, familial, 3A; ; SCN1A
 Febrile convulsions, familial, 3B; ; SCN9A
 Febrilel, convulsions, familial; ; GABRG2
 Fechtner syndrome; ; MYH9
 Feingold syndrome; ; MYCN
 Fertile eunuch syndrome; ; GNRHR
 Fetal akinesia deformation sequence; ; DOK7
 Fetal akinesia deformation sequence; ; RAPSN
 Fetal hemoglobin quantitative trait locus 1; ; HBG1
 Fetal hemoglobin quantitative trait locus 1; ; HBG2
 FG syndrome 2; ; FLNA
 FG syndrome 4; ; CASK
 Fibrodysplasia ossificans progressiva; ; ACVR1
 Fibromatosis, gingival; ; SOS1
 Fibromatosis, gingival, 2; ; GINGF2
 Fibromatosis, juvenile hyaline; ; ANTXR2
 Fibrosis of extraocular muscles, congenital, 1; ; KIF21A
 Fibrosis of extraocular muscles, congenital, 2; ; PHOX2A
 Fibrosis of extraocular muscles, congenital, 3A; ; TUBB3
 Fibrosis of extraocular muscles, congenital, 3B; ; KIF21A
 Fibular hypoplasia and complex brachydactyly; ; GDF5
 Fish-eye disease; ; LCAT
 Fletcher factor deficiency; ; KLKB1
 Focal cortical dysplasia, Taylor balloon cell type; ; TSC1
 Focal dermal hypoplasia; ; PORCN
 Folate malabsorption, hereditary; ; SLC46A1
 Follicle-stimulating hormone deficiency, isolated; ; FSHB
 Foveal hyperplasia; ; PAX6
 Foveomacular dystrophy, adult-onset, with choroidal neovascularization; ; PRPH2
 Fragile X syndrome; ; FMR1
 Fragile X tremor/ataxia syndrome; ; FMR1
 Frank–ter Haar syndrome; ; SH3PXD2B
 Fraser syndrome; ; FRAS1
 Fraser syndrome; ; FREM2
 Frasier syndrome; ; WT1
 Friedreich's ataxia with retained reflexes; ; FXN
 Friedreich's ataxia; ; FXN
 Frontometaphyseal dysplasia; ; FLNA
 Frontonasal dysplasia 2; ; ALX4
 Frontonasal dysplasia 3; ; ALX1
 Frontorhiny; ; ALX3
 Frontotemporal lobar degeneration with ubiquitin-positive inclusions; ; GRN
 Frontotemporal lobar degeneration, TARDBP-related; ; TARDBP
 Fructose intolerance; ; ALDOB
 Fructose-1,6-bisphosphatase deficiency; ; FBP1
 Fucosidosis; ; FUCA1
 Fuhrmann syndrome; ; WNT7A
 Fumarase deficiency; ; FH
 Fundus albipunctatus; ; RDH5
 Fundus albipunctatus; ; RLBP1
 Fundus flavimaculatus; ; ABCA4
 GABA-transaminase deficiency; ; ABAT
 Galactokinase deficiency with cataracts; ; GALK1
 Galactose epimerase deficiency; ; GALE
 Galactosemia; ; GALT
 Galactosialidosis; ; CTSA
 Gallbladder disease 1; ; ABCB4
 Gallbladder disease 4; ; ABCG8
 GAMT deficiency; ; GAMT
 Gastric cancer, familial diffuse; ; CDH1
 Gastric cancer, somatic; ; APC
 Gastric cancer, somatic; ; CASP10
 Gastric cancer, somatic; ; ERBB2
 Gastric cancer, somatic; ; FGFR2
 Gastric cancer, somatic; ; IRF1
 Gastric cancer, somatic; ; KLF6
 Gastric cancer, somatic; ; MUTYH
 Gastric cancer, somatic; ; PIK3CA
 Gastrointestinal stromal tumor, somatic; ; KIT
 Gastrointestinal stromal tumor, somatic; ; PDGFRA
 Gaucher disease, atypical; ; PSAP
 Gaucher disease, perinatal lethal; ; GBA
 Gaucher disease, type; ; GBA
 Gaucher disease, type II; ; GBA
 Gaucher disease, type III; ; GBA
 Gaucher disease, type IIIC; ; GBA
 Gaze palsy, horizontal, with progressive scoliosis; ; ROBO3
 Geleophysic dysplasia; ; ADAMTSL2
 Generalized epilepsy and paroxysmal dyskinesia; ; KCNMA1
 Generalized epilepsy with febrile seizures plus; ; SCN1B
 Germ cell tumors; ; KIT
 Geroderma osteodysplasticum; ; SCYL1BP1
 Gerstmann–Sträussler–Scheinker syndrome; ; PRNP
 Ghosal syndrome; ; TBXAS1
 Giant axonal neuropathy-1; ; GAN
 Gillespie syndrome; ; PAX6
 Gitelman syndrome; ; SLC12A3
 Glanzmann thrombasthenia, type A; ; ITGA2B
 Glaucoma 1, open angle, 1O; ; NTF4
 Glaucoma 1, open angle, E; ; OPTN
 Glaucoma 1, open angle, G; ; WDR36
 Glaucoma 1A, primary open angle, juvenile-onset; ; MYOC
 Glaucoma 1B, primary open angle, adult onset; ; GLC1B
 Glaucoma 3, primary congenital, D; ; LTBP2
 Glaucoma 3A, primary congenital; ; CYP1B1
 Glaucoma, primary open angle, adult-onset; ; CYP1B1
 Glaucoma, primary open angle, juvenile-onset; ; CYP1B1
 Glioblastoma, somatic; ; ERBB2
 Globozoospermia; ; GOPC
 Globozoospermia; ; SPATA16
 Glomerulocystic kidney disease with hyperuricemia and isosthenuria; ; UMOD
 Glomerulopathy with fibronectin deposits 2; ; FN1
 Glomerulosclerosis, focal segmental, 1; ; ACTN4
 Glomerulosclerosis, focal segmental, 2; ; TRPC6
 Glomerulosclerosis, focal segmental, 3; ; CD2AP
 Glomerulosclerosis, focal segmental, 5; ; INF2
 Glomuvenous malformations; ; GLML
 Glucocorticoid deficiency 2; ; MRAP
 Glucocorticoid deficiency, due to ACTH unresponsiveness; ; MC2R
 Glucose-galactose malabsorption; ; SLC5A1
 GLUT1 deficiency syndrome 1; ; SLC2A1
 GLUT1 deficiency syndrome 2; ; SLC2A1
 Glutamate formiminotransferase deficiency; ; FTCD
 Glutamine deficiency, congenital; ; GLUL
 Glutaricaciduria, type I; ; GCDH
 Glutaricaciduria, type IIA; ; ETFA
 Glutaricaciduria, type IIB; ; ETFB
 Glutaricaciduria, type IIC; ; ETFDH
 Glutathione synthetase deficiency; ; GSS
 Glycerol kinase deficiency; ; GK
 Glycine encephalopathy; ; AMT
 Glycine encephalopathy; ; GCSH
 Glycine encephalopathy; ; GLDC
 Glycine N-methyltransferase deficiency; ; GNMT
 Glycogen storage disease 0, muscle; ; GYS1
 Glycogen storage disease Ib; ; SLC37A4
 Glycogen storage disease Ic; ; SLC37A4
 Glycogen storage disease Ic; ; SLC17A3
 Glycogen storage disease II; ; GAA
 Glycogen storage disease IIb; ; LAMP2
 Glycogen storage disease IIIa; ; AGL
 Glycogen storage disease IIIb; ; AGL
 Glycogen storage disease IV; ; GBE1
 Glycogen storage disease IXc; ; PHKG2
 Glycogen storage disease of heart, lethal congenital; ; PRKAG2
 Glycogen storage disease VII; ; PFKM
 Glycogen storage disease X; ; PGAM2
 Glycogen storage disease XI; ; LDHA
 Glycogen storage disease XII; ; ALDOA
 Glycogen storage disease XIII; ; ENO3
 Glycogen storage disease XIV; ; PGM1
 Glycogen storage disease XV; ; GYG1
 Glycogen storage disease type 0; ; GYS2
 Glycogen storage disease, type IXa1; ; PHKA2
 Glycogen storage disease, type IXa2; ; PHKA2
 Glycosylphosphatidylinositol deficiency; ; PIGM
 GM1-gangliosidosis, type I; ; GLB1
 GM1-gangliosidosis, type II; ; GLB1
 GM1-gangliosidosis, type III; ; GLB1
 GM2-gangliosidosis, AB variant; ; GM2A
 GM2-gangliosidosis, several forms; ; HEXA
 Gnathodiaphyseal dysplasia; ; ANO5
 Goldberg–Shpritzen megacolon syndrome; ; KIAA1279
 Gout, PRPS-related; ; PRPS1
 GRACILE syndrome; ; BCS1L
 Greenberg dysplasia; ; LBR
 Greig cephalopolysyndactyly syndrome; ; GLI3
 Griscelli syndrome type 1; ; MYO5A
 Griscelli syndrome type 2; ; RAB27A
 Griscelli syndrome type 3; ; MLPH
 Growth hormone deficiency with pituitary anomalies; ; HESX1
 Growth hormone deficiency, isolated, type IA; ; GH1
 Growth hormone deficiency, isolated, type IB; ; GH1
 Growth hormone deficiency, isolated, type IB; ; GHRHR
 Growth hormone deficiency, isolated, type II; ; GH1
 Growth hormone insensitivity with immunodeficiency; ; STAT5B
 Growth retardation with deafness and mental retardation due to IGF1 deficiency; ; IGF1
 Growth retardation, developmental delay, coarse facies, and early death; ; FTO
 Guttmacher syndrome; ; HOXA13
 Gyrate atrophy of choroid and retina with or without ornithinemia; ; OAT
 Haddad syndrome; ; ASCL1
 Hailey–Hailey disease; ; ATP2C1
 Haim–Munk syndrome; ; CTSC
 Hallermann–Streiff syndrome; ; GJA1
 Hand-foot-uterus Syndrome; ; HOXA13
 Harderoporphyria; ; CPOX
 HARP syndrome; ; PANK2
 Hartnup disorder; ; SLC6A19
 Hawkinsinuria; ; HPD
 Hay–Wells syndrome; ; TP63
 HDL deficiency, type 2; ; ABCA1
 Hearing loss, low-frequency sensorineural; ; WFS1
 Heart block, nonprogressive; ; SCN5A
 Heart block, progressive, type IA; ; SCN5A
 Heinz body anemia; ; HBA2
 Heinz body anemias, alpha-; ; HBA1
 Heinz body anemias, beta-; ; HBB
 HELLP syndrome, maternal, of pregnancy; ; HADHA
 Hemangioma, capillary infantile, somatic; ; FLT4
 Hemangioma, capillary infantile, somatic; ; KDR
 Hematopoiesis, cyclic; ; ELANE
 Hematuria, benign familial; ; COL4A3
 Hemiplegic migraine, familial; ; CACNA1A
 Hemochromatosis, type 2A; ; HJV
 Hemochromatosis, type 2B; ; HAMP
 Hemochromatosis, type 3; ; TFR2
 Hemochromatosis, type 4; ; SLC40A1
 Hemolytic anemia due to adenylate kinase deficiency; ; AK1
 Hemolytic anemia due to gamma-glutamylcysteine synthetase deficiency; ; GCLC
 Hemolytic anemia due to glutathione synthetase deficiency; ; GSS
 Hemolytic anemia due to hexokinase deficiency; ; HK1
 Hemolytic anemia, nonspherocytic, due to glucose phosphate isomerase deficiency; ; GPI
 Hemolytic uremic syndrome, atypical, susceptibility to, 1; ; HF1
 Hemophagocytic lymphohistiocytosis, familial, 2; ; PRF1
 Hemophagocytic lymphohistiocytosis, familial, 3; ; UNC13D
 Hemophagocytic lymphohistiocytosis, familial, 4; ; STX11
 Hemophilia B; ; F9
 Hemorrhagic diathesis due to \'antithrombin\' Pittsburgh; ; SERPINA1
 Hemosiderosis, systemic, due to aceruloplasminemia; ; CP
 Hennekam lymphangiectasia-lymphedema syndrome; ; CCBE1
 Hepatic adenoma; ; HNF1A
 Hepatic venoocclusive disease with immunodeficiency; ; SP110
 Hepatocellular cancer; ; PDGFRL
 Hepatocellular carcinoma; ; CTNNB1
 Hepatocellular carcinoma; ; TP53
 Hepatocellular carcinoma, childhood type; ; MET
 Hepatocellular carcinoma, somatic; ; AXIN1
 Hepatocellular carcinoma, somatic; ; CASP8
 Hepatocellular carcinoma, somatic; ; PIK3CA
 Hereditary hemorrhagic telangiectasia-1; ; ENG
 Hereditary hemorrhagic telangiectasia-2; ; ACVRL1
 Hereditary motor and sensory neuropathy VI; ; MFN2
 Hereditary motor and sensory neuropathy, type IIc; ; TRPV4
 Hermansky–Pudlak syndrome 1; ; HPS1
 Hermansky–Pudlak syndrome 2; ; AP3B1
 Hermansky–Pudlak syndrome 3; ; HPS3
 Hermansky–Pudlak syndrome 4; ; HPS4
 Hermansky–Pudlak syndrome 5; ; HPS5
 Hermansky–Pudlak syndrome 6; ; HPS6
 Hermansky–Pudlak syndrome 7; ; DTNBP1
 Hermansky–Pudlak syndrome 8; ; BLOC1S3
 Heterotaxy, visceral, 1, S-linke; ; ZIC3
 Heterotaxy, visceral, 2, autosomal; ; CFC1
 Heterotaxy, visceral, 5; ; NODAL
 Heterotopia, periventricular; ; FLNA
 Heterotopia, periventricular, ED variant; ; FLNA
 Hirschsprung's disease; ; GDNF
 Hirschsprung's disease; ; RET
 Hirschsprung disease, short-segment; ; PMX2B
 Histiocytoma, angiomatoid fibrous, somatic; ; CREB1
 HMG-CoA synthase-2 deficiency; ; HMGCS2
 Hodgkin's lymphoma; ; KLHDC8B
 Holocarboxylase synthetase deficiency; ; HLCS
 Holoprosencephaly-2; ; SIX3
 Holoprosencephaly-3; ; SHH
 Holoprosencephaly-4; ; TGIF
 Holoprosencephaly-5; ; ZIC2
 Holoprosencephaly-7; ; PTCH1
 Holoprosencephaly-9; ; GLI2
 Holt–Oram syndrome; ; TBX5
 Homocystinuria due to MTHFR deficiency; ; MTHFR
 Homocystinuria, B6-responsive and nonresponsive types; ; CBS
 Homocystinuria, cblD type, variant 1; ; C2orf25
 Homocystinuria-megaloblastic anemia, cbl E type; ; MTRR
 Hoyeraal–Hreidarsson syndrome; ; DKC1
 HPRT-related gout; ; HPRT1
 Huntington's disease; ; HTT
 Huntington disease-like 1; ; PRNP
 Huntington disease-like 2; ; JPH3
 Hutchinson–Gilford progeria syndrome; ; LMNA
 Hyalinosis, infantile systemic; ; ANTXR2
 Hydatidiform mole; ; NALP7
 Hydranencephaly with abnormal genitalia; ; ARX
 Hydrocephalus due to aqueductal stenosis; ; L1CAM
 Hydrocephalus with congenital idiopathic intestinal pseudoobstruction; ; L1CAM
 Hydrocephalus with Hirschsprung disease and cleft palate; ; L1CAM
 Hydrolethalus syndrome; ; HYLS1
 Hyperalphalipoproteinemia; ; CETP
 Hyperbilirubinemia, familial transcient neonatal; ; UGT1A1
 Hypercarotenemia and vitamin A deficiency, autosomal dominant; ; BCMO1
 Hypercholanemia, familial; ; BAAT
 Hypercholanemia, familial; ; EPHX1
 Hypercholanemia, familial; ; TJP2
 Hypercholesterolemia, due to ligand-defective apo B; ; APOB
 Hypercholesterolemia, familial; ; LDLR
 Hypercholesterolemia, familial, 3; ; PCSK9
 Hypercholesterolemia, familial, autosomal recessive; ; LDLRAP1
 Hypercholesterolemia, familial, modification of; ; APOA2
 Hyperchylomicronemia, late-onset; ; APOA5
 Hyperekplexia and epilepsy; ; ARHGEF9
 Hyperekplexia; ; GPHN
 Hyperekplexia; ; SLC6A5
 Hyperekplexia, autosomal recessive; ; GLRB
 Hypereosinophilic syndrome, idiopathic, resistant to imatinib; ; PDGFRA
 Hyperferritinemia-cataract syndrome; ; FTL
 Hyperfibrinolysis, familial, due to increased release of PLAT; ; PLAT
 Hyperglycinuria; ; SLC36A2
 Hyperglycinuria; ; SLC6A19
 Hyperglycinuria; ; SLC6A20
 Hyper-IgD syndrome; ; MVK
 Hyper-IgE recurrent infection syndrome; ; STAT3
 Hyper-IgE recurrent infection syndrome, autosomal recessive; ; DOCK8
 Hyperinsulinemic hypoglycemia, familial, 1; ; ABCC8
 Hyperinsulinemic hypoglycemia, familial, 2; ; KCNJ11
 Hyperinsulinemic hypoglycemia, familial, 3; ; GCK
 Hyperinsulinemic hypoglycemia, familial, 4; ; HADHSC
 Hyperinsulinemic hypoglycemia, familial, 5; ; INSR
 Hyperinsulinemic hypoglycemia, familial, 7; ; SLC16A1
 Hyperinsulinism-hyperammonemia syndrome; ; GLUD1
 Hyperkalemic periodic paralysis, type 2; ; SCN4A
 Hyperkeratotic cutaneous capillary-venous malformations associated with cerebral capillary malformations; ; CCM1
 Hyperlipoproteinemia, type Ib; ; APOC2
 Hyperlysinemia; ; AASS
 Hypermethioninemia, persistent, autosomal dominant, due to methionine adenosyltransferase I/III deficiency; ; MAT1A
 Hyperornithinemia-hyperammonemia-homocitrullinemia syndrome; ; SLC25A15
 Hyperostosis, endosteal; ; LRP5
 Hyperoxaluria, primary, type 1; ; AGXT
 Hyperoxaluria, primary, type II; ; GRHPR
 Hyperoxaluria, primary, type III; ; DHDPSL
 Hyperparathyroidism, AD; ; MEN1
 Hyperparathyroidism, familial primary; ; HRPT2
 Hyperparathyroidism, neonatal; ; CASR
 Hyperparathyroidism-jaw tumor syndrome; ; HRPT2
 Hyperpehnylalaninemia, BH4-deficient, B; ; GCH1
 Hyperphenylalaninemia, BH4-deficient, A; ; PTS
 Hyperphenylalaninemia, BH4-deficient, C; ; QDPR
 Hyperphenylalaninemia, BH4-deficient, D; ; PCBD
 Hyperpigmentation, cutaneous, with hypertrichosis, hepatosplenomegaly, heart anomalies, hearing loss, and hypogonadism; ; SLC29A3
 Hyperpigmentation, familial progressive; ; KITLG
 Hyperprolinemia, type I; ; PRODH
 Hyperprolinemia, type II; ; ALDH4A1
 Hypertension, early-onset, autosomal dominant, with exacerbation in pregnancy; ; NR3C2
 Hypertension, essential; ; PNMT
 Hypertension, essential; ; AGTR1
 Hypertension, essential; ; PTGIS
 Hyperthyroidism, familial gestational; ; TSHR
 Hyperthyroidism, nonautoimmune; ; TSHR
 Hypertrophic osteoarthropathy, primary, autosomal recessive; ; HPGD
 Hyperuricemic nephropathy, familial juvenile 1; ; UMOD
 Hyperuricemic nephropathy, familial juvenile 2; ; REN
 Hypoaldosteronism, congenital, due to CMO I deficiency; ; CYP11B2
 Hypoaldosteronism, congenital, due to CMO II deficiency; ; CYP11B2
 Hypoalphalipoproteinemia; ; APOA1
 Hypocalcemia, autosomal dominant; ; CASR
 Hypocalciuric hypercalcemia, type I; ; CASR
 Hypochondroplasia; ; FGFR3
 Hypoglycemia of infancy, leucine-sensitive; ; ABCC8
 Hypogonadism, hypogonadotropic; ; PROK2
 Hypogonadotropic hypogonadism due to GNRH deficiency; ; GNRH1
 Hypogonadotropic hypogonadism; ; CHD7
 Hypogonadotropic hypogonadism; ; FGFR1
 Hypogonadotropic hypogonadism; ; KISS1R
 Hypogonadotropic hypogonadism; ; NELF
 Hypogonadotropic hypogonadism; ; TAC3
 Hypogonadotropic hypogonadism; ; TACR3
 Hypokalemic periodic paralysis type 1; ; CACNA1S
 Hypomagnesemia 4, renal; ; EGF
 Hypomagnesemia with secondary hypocalcemia; ; TRPM6
 Hypomagnesemia, primary; ; CLDN16
 Hypomagnesemia, renal, with ocular involvement; ; CLDN19
 Hypomagnesemia-2, renal; ; FXYD2
 Hypomyelination, global cerebral; ; SLC25A12
 Hypoparathyroidism, autosomal dominant; ; PTH
 Hypoparathyroidism, autosomal recessive; ; PTH
 Hypoparathyroidism, familial isolated; ; GCMB
 Hypoparathyroidism, sensorineural deafness, and renal dysplasia; ; GATA3
 Hypoparathyroidism-retardation-dysmorphism syndrome; ; TBCE
 Hypophosphatasia, adult; ; ALPL
 Hypophosphatasia, childhood; ; ALPL
 Hypophosphatasia, infantile; ; ALPL
 Hypophosphatemia, X-linked; ; PHEX
 Hypophosphatemic rickets with hypercalciuria; ; SLC34A3
 Hypophosphatemic rickets; ; CLCN5
 Hypophosphatemic rickets, AR; ; DMP1
 Hypophosphatemic rickets, autosomal dominant; ; FGF23
 Hypophosphatemic rickets, autosomal recessive, 2; ; ENPP1
 Hypoplastic left heart syndrome; ; GJA1
 Hypoproteinemia, hypercatabolic; ; B2M
 Hypospadias 1, X-linked; ; AR
 Hypospadias 2, X-linked; ; MAMLD1
 Hypothryoidism, congenital, nongoitrous 4; ; TSHB
 Hypothyroidism, congenital nongoitrous, 5; ; NKX2E
 Hypothyroidism, congenital, due to thyroid dysgenesis or hypoplasia; ; PAX8
 Hypothyroidism, congenital, nongoitrous; ; TSHR
 Hypotrichosis and recurrent skin vesicles; ; DSC3
 Hypotrichosis simplex of scalp; ; CDSN
 Hypotrichosis, congenital, with juvenile macular dystrophy; ; CDH3
 Hypotrichosis, hereditary, Marie Unna type, 1; ; HR
 Hypotrichosis, localized, autosomal recessive 2; ; LIPH
 Hypotrichosis, localized, autosomal recessive, 3; ; P2RY5
 Hypotrichosis, localized, autosomal recessive; ; DSG4
 Hypotrichosis-lymphedema-telangiectasia syndrome; ; SOX18
 Hypouricemia, renal, 2; ; SLC2A9
 Hypouricemia, renal; ; SLC22A12
 Hystrix-like ichthyosis with deafness; ; GJB2
 Ichthyosiform erythroderma, congenital; ; TGM1
 Ichthyosiform erythroderma, congenital, nonbullous, 1; ; ALOX12B
 Ichthyosiform erythroderma, congenital, nonbullous, 1; ; ALOXE3
 Ichthyosis bullosa of Siemens; ; KRT2
 Ichthyosis follicularis, atrichia, and photophobia syndrome; ; MBTPS2
 Ichthyosis histrix, Curth-Macklin Palmoplantar keratoderma, nonepidermolytic; ; KRT1
 Ichthyosis prematurity syndrome; ; SLC27A4
 Ichthyosis vulgaris; ; FLG
 Ichthyosis with confetti; ; KRT10
 Ichthyosis with hypotrichosis; ; ST14
 Ichthyosis, congenital, autosomal recessive; ; ICHYN
 Ichthyosis, cyclic, with epidermolytic hyperkeratosis; ; KRT1
 Ichthyosis, cyclic, with epidermolytic hyperkeratosis; ; KRT10
 Ichthyosis, harlequin; ; ABCA12
 Ichthyosis, lamellar 2; ; ABCA12
 Ichthyosis, lamellar, 3; ; CYP4F22
 Ichthyosis, lamellar, autosomal recessive; ; TGM1
 Ichthyosis, leukocyte vacuoles, alopecia, and sclerosing cholangitis; ; CLDN1
 Ichthyosis, X-linked; ; STS
 Iminoglycinuria, digenic; ; SLC36A2
 Iminoglycinuria, digenic; ; SLC6A19
 Iminoglycinuria, digenic; ; SLC6A20
 Immune dysfunction with T-cell inactivation due to calcium entry defect 1; ; ORAI1
 Immune dysfunction, with T-cell inactivation due to calcium entry defect 2; ; STIM1
 Immunodeficiency due to defect in CD3-zeta; ; CD247
 Immunodeficiency due to defect in MAPBP-interacting protein; ; MAPBPIP
 Immunodeficiency due to purine nucleoside phosphorylase deficiency; ; PNP
 Immunodeficiency with hyper IgM, type 4; ; UNG
 Immunodeficiency with hyper-IgM, type 2; ; AICDA
 Immunodeficiency with hyper-IgM, type 3; ; TNFRSF5
 Immunodeficiency, common variable, 1; ; ICOS
 Immunodeficiency, common variable, 2; ; TNFRSF13B
 Immunodeficiency, common variable, 3; ; CD19
 Immunodeficiency, common variable, 4; ; TNFRSF13C
 Immunodeficiency, common variable, 5; ; MS4A1
 Immunodeficiency, common variable, 6; ; CD81
 Immunodeficiency, hypogammaglobulinemia, and reduced B cells; ; CD79B
 Immunodeficiency, isolated; ; IKBKG
 Immunodeficiency, X-linked, with hyper-IgM; ; TNFSF5
 Immunodeficiency–centromeric instability–facial anomalies syndrome; ; DNMT3B
 Immunodysregulation, polyendocrinopathy, and enteropathy, X-linked; ; FOXP3
 Immunoglobulin A deficiency 2; ; TNFRSF13B
 Inclusion body myopathy with early-onset Paget disease and frontotemporal dementia; ; VCP
 Inclusion body myopathy, autosomal recessive; ; GNE
 Inclusion body myopathy-3; ; MYH2
 Incontinentia pigmenti, type II; ; IKBKG
 Infantile neuroaxonal dystrophy 1; ; PLA2G6
 Inflammatory bowel disease 25; ; CRFB4
 Insensitivity to pain, channelopathy-associated; ; SCN9A
 Insensitivity to pain, congenital, with anhidrosis; ; NTRK1
 Insomnia, fatal familial; ; PRNP
 Insulin resistance, severe, digenic; ; PPARG
 Insulin resistance, severe, digenic; ; PPP1R3A
 Insulin-like growth factor I, resistance to; ; IGF1R
 Interleukin 1 receptor antagonist deficiency; ; IL1RN
 Interleukin-2 receptor, alpha chain, deficiency of; ; IL2RA
 Intestinal pseudoobstruction, neuronal; ; FLNA
 Intrinsic factor deficiency; ; GIF
 Invasive pneumococcal disease, recurrent isolated, 1; ; IRAK4
 IRAK4 deficiency; ; IRAK4
 Iridogoniodysgenesis, type 1; ; FOXC1
 Iridogoniodysgenesis, type 2; ; PITX2
 Iris hypoplasia and glaucoma; ; FOXC1
 Iron-refractory iron deficiency anemia; ; TMPRSS6
 Isobutyryl-coenzyme A dehydrogenase deficiency; ; ACAD8
 Isovaleric acidemia; ; IVD
 IVIC syndrome; ; SALL4
 Jackson–Weiss syndrome; ; FGFR1
 Jackson–Weiss syndrome; ; FGFR2
 Jalili syndrome; ; CNNM4
 Jensen syndrome; ; TIMM8A
 Jervell and Lange-Nielsen syndrome 2; ; KCNE1
 Jervell and Lange-Nielsen syndrome; ; KCNQ1
 Johanson–Blizzard syndrome; ; UBR1
 Joubert syndrome 1; ; INPP5E
 Joubert syndrome 10; ; OFD1
 Joubert syndrome 2; ; TMEM216
 Joubert syndrome 4; ; NPHP1
 Joubert syndrome 5; ; CEP290
 Joubert syndrome 6; ; TMEM67
 Joubert syndrome 7; ; RPGRIP1L
 Joubert syndrome 8; ; ARL13B
 Joubert syndrome 9; ; CC2D2A
 Joubert syndrome-3; ; AHI1
 Juvenile polyposis syndrome, infantile form; ; BMPR1A
 Juvenile polyposis/hereditary hemorrhagic telangiectasia syndrome; ; MADH4
 Kallmann syndrome 2; ; FGFR1
 Kallmann syndrome 3; ; PROKR2
 Kallmann syndrome 4; ; PROK2
 Kallmann syndrome 5; ; CHD7
 Kallmann syndrome 6; ; FGF8
 Kanzaki disease; ; NAGA
 Karak syndrome; ; PLA2G6
 Kenny–Caffey syndrome-1; ; TBCE
 Keratitis; ; PAX6
 Keratitis–ichthyosis–deafness syndrome; ; GJB2
 Keratoconus; ; VSX1
 Keratoderma, palmoplantar, with deafness; ; GJB2
 Keratosis follicularis spinulosa decalvans; ; SAT1
 Keratosis linearis with ichthyosis congenita and sclerosing keratoderma; ; POMP
 Keratosis palmoplantaris striata I; ; DSG1
 Keratosis palmoplantaris striata II; ; DSP
 Keratosis palmoplantaris striata III; ; KRT1
 Keratosis, seborrheic, somatic; ; PIK3CA
 Keutel syndrome; ; MGP
 Kindler syndrome; ; KIND1
 Kleefstra syndrome; ; EHMT1
 Klippel–Feil syndrome, autosomal dominant; ; GDF6
 Kniest dysplasia; ; COL2A1
 Knobloch syndrome, type 1; ; COL18A1
 Kowarski syndrome; ; GH1
 Krabbe disease; ; GALC
 Krabbe disease, atypical; ; PSAP
 L-2-hydroxyglutaric aciduria; ; L2HGDH
 Lactase deficiency, congenital; ; LCT
 Lactase persistence/nonpersistence; ; MCM6
 Lactic acidosis, fatal infantile; ; SUCLG1
 Lacticacidemia due to PDX1 deficiency; ; PDX1
 LADD syndrome; ; FGF10
 LADD syndrome; ; FGFR3
 Laing distal myopathy; ; MYH7
 Langer mesomelic dysplasia; ; SHOX
 Langer mesomelic dysplasia; ; SHOXY
 Laron dwarfism; ; GHR
 Larsen syndrome; ; FLNB
 Laryngoonychocutaneous syndrome; ; LAMA3
 Lathosterolosis; ; SC5DL
 LCHAD deficiency; ; HADHA
 Leber congenital amaurosis 1; ; GUCY2D
 Leber congenital amaurosis 10; ; CEP290
 Leber congenital amaurosis 12; ; RD3
 Leber congenital amaurosis 13; ; RDH12
 Leber congenital amaurosis 14; ; LRAT
 Leber congenital amaurosis 2; ; RPE65
 Leber congenital amaurosis 3; ; SPATA7
 Leber congenital amaurosis 4; ; AIPL1
 Leber congenital amaurosis 5; ; LCA5
 Left ventricular noncompaction 1, with or without congenital heart defects; ; DTNA
 Left ventricular noncompaction 3, with or without dilated cardiomyopathy; ; LDB3
 Left ventricular noncompaction 4; ; ACTC1
 Left ventricular noncompaction 5; ; MYH7
 Left ventricular noncompaction 6; ; TNNT2
 Left ventricular noncompaction, X-linked; ; TAZ
 Legius syndrome; ; SPRED1
 Leigh syndrome due to cytochrome c oxidase deficiency; ; COX15
 Leigh syndrome due to mitochondrial complex I deficiency; ; C8orf38
 Leigh syndrome due to mitochondrial complex I deficiency; ; NDUFA2
 Leigh syndrome; ; BCS1L
 Leigh syndrome; ; DLD
 Leigh syndrome; ; NDUFS3
 Leigh syndrome; ; NDUFS4
 Leigh syndrome; ; NDUFS7
 Leigh syndrome; ; NDUFS8
 Leigh syndrome; ; NDUFV1
 Leigh syndrome; ; SDHA
 Leigh syndrome, due to COX deficiency; ; SURF1
 Leigh syndrome, French-Canadian type; ; LRPPRC
 Leigh syndrome, X-linked; ; PDHA1
 Leiomyomatosis and renal cell cancer; ; FH
 Leiomyomatosis, diffuse, with Alport syndrome; ; COL4A6
 LEOPARD syndrome 2; ; RAF1
 Leopard syndrome; ; PTPN11
 Leprechaunism; ; INSR
 Léri–Weill dyschondrosteosis; ; SHOX
 Leri–Weill dyschondrosteosis; ; SHOXY
 Lesch–Nyhan syndrome; ; HPRT1
 Lethal congenital contractural syndrome 2; ; ERBB3
 Lethal congenital contractural syndrome 3; ; PIP5K1C
 Lethal congenital contracture syndrome 1; ; GLE1
 Leukemia, acute lymphocytic; ; BCR
 Leukemia, acute myelogenous; ; AMLCR2
 Leukemia, acute myelogenous; ; GMPS
 Leukemia, acute myelogenous; ; JAK2
 Leukemia, acute myeloid; ; MLF1
 Leukemia, acute myeloid; ; NSD1
 Leukemia, acute myeloid; ; SH3GL1
 Leukemia, acute myeloid; ; AF10
 Leukemia, acute myeloid; ; ARHGEF12
 Leukemia, acute myeloid; ; CEBPA
 Leukemia, acute myeloid; ; FLT3
 Leukemia, acute myeloid; ; KIT
 Leukemia, acute myeloid; ; LPP
 Leukemia, acute myeloid; ; NPM1
 Leukemia, acute myeloid; ; NUP214
 Leukemia, acute myeloid; ; PICALM
 Leukemia, acute myeloid; ; RUNX1
 Leukemia, acute myeloid; ; WHSC1L1
 Leukemia, acute myeloid, somatic; ; ETV6
 Leukemia, acute promyelocytic; ; RARA
 Leukemia, chronic myeloid; ; BCR
 Leukemia, juvenile myelomonocytic; ; ARHGAP26
 Leukemia, juvenile myelomonocytic; ; NF1
 Leukemia, juvenile myelomonocytic; ; PTPN11
 Leukemia, megakaryoblastic, of Down syndrome; ; GATA1
 Leukemia, megakaryoblastic, with or without Down syndrome; ; GATA1
 Leukocyte adhesion deficiency; ; ITGB2
 Leukocyte adhesion deficiency, type III; ; KIND3
 Leukodystrophy, adult-onset, autosomal dominant; ; LMNB1
 Leukodystrophy, dysmyelinating, and spastic paraparesis with or without dystonia; ; FA2H
 Leukodystrophy, hypomyelinating, 2; ; GJC2
 Leukodystrophy, hypomyelinating, 4; ; HSPD1
 Leukodystrophy, hypomyelinating, 5; ; FAM126A
 Leukoencephalopathy with brain stem and spinal cord involvement and lactate elevation; ; DARS2
 Leukoencephalopathy with vanishing white matter; ; EIF2B1
 Leukoencephalopathy with vanishing white matter; ; EIF2B2
 Leukoencephalopathy with vanishing white matter; ; EIF2B3
 Leukoencephalopathy with vanishing white matter; ; EIF2B5
 Leukoencephalopathy, cystic, without megalencephaly; ; RNASET2
 Leukoencephaly with vanishing white matter; ; EIF2B4
 Leydig cell adenoma, somatic, with precocious puberty; ; LHCGR
 Leydig cell hypoplasia with hypergonadotropic hypogonadism; ; LHCGR
 Leydig cell hypoplasia with pseudohermaphroditism; ; LHCGR
 Lhermitte–Duclos syndrome; ; PTEN
 Liddle syndrome; ; SCNN1B
 Liddle syndrome; ; SCNN1G
 Li–Fraumeni syndrome; ; CDKN2A
 Li–Fraumeni syndrome; ; TP53
 Li–Fraumeni syndrome; ; CHEK2
 Li–Fraumeni-like syndrome; ; TP53
 LIG4 syndrome; ; LIG4
 Limb-mammary syndrome; ; TP63
 Lipase deficiency, combined; ; LMF1
 Lipodystrophy, congenital generalized, type 1; ; AGPAT2
 Lipodystrophy, congenital generalized, type 2; ; BSCL2
 Lipodystrophy, congenital generalized, type 3; ; CAV1
 Lipodystrophy, congenital generalized, type 4; ; PTRF
 Lipodystrophy, familial partial; ; LMNA
 Lipodystrophy, familial partial, type 3; ; PPARG
 Lipodystrophy, partial, acquired; ; LMNB2
 Lipoid adrenal hyperplasia; ; STAR
 Lipoid congenital adrenal hyperplasia; ; CYP11A
 Lipoid proteinosis; ; ECM1
 Lipoprotein glomerulopathy; ; APOE
 Lipoprotein lipase deficiency; ; LPL
 Lissencephaly 3; ; TUBA1A
 Lissencephaly syndrome, Norman–Roberts type; ; RELN
 Lissencephaly, X-linked 2; ; ARX
 Lissencephaly, X-linked; ; DCX
 Lissencephaly-1; ; PAFAH1B1
 Liver failure, acute infantile; ; TRMU
 Loeys–Dietz syndrome, type 1A; ; TGFBR1
 Loeys–Dietz syndrome, type 1B; ; TGFBR2
 Loeys–Dietz syndrome, type 2A; ; TGFBR1
 Loeys–Dietz syndrome, type 2B; ; TGFBR2
 Long QT syndrome 12; ; SNT1
 Long QT syndrome 13; ; KCNJ5
 Long QT syndrome-1; ; KCNQ1
 Long QT syndrome-10; ; SCN4B
 Long QT syndrome-11; ; AKAP9
 Long QT syndrome-3; ; SCN5A
 Long QT syndrome-4; ; ANK2
 Long QT syndrome-7; ; KCNJ2
 Long QT syndrome-9; ; CAV3
 Lowe syndrome; ; OCRL
 Lujan–Fryns syndrome; ; MED12
 Lung cancer; ; DLEC1
 Lung cancer; ; RASSF1
 Lung cancer; ; KRAS
 Lung cancer; ; PPP2R1B
 Lung cancer; ; SLC22A1L
 Lung cancer, somatic; ; MAP3K8
 Luteinizing hormone resistance, female; ; LHCGR
 Lymphangioleiomyomatosis; ; TSC1
 Lymphangioleiomyomatosis, somatic; ; TSC2
 Lymphedema, hereditary I; ; FLT4
 Lymphedema, hereditary, IC; ; GJC2
 Lymphedema–distichiasis syndrome with renal disease and diabetes mellitus; ; FOXC2
 Lymphedema–distichiasis syndrome; ; FOXC2
 Lymphoma, non-Hodgkin; ; PRF1
 Lymphoma, non-Hodgkin, somatic; ; RAD54L
 Lymphoproliferative syndrome, EBV-associated, autosomal, 1; ; ITK
 Lymphoproliferative syndrome, X-linked, 2; ; BIRC4
 Lymphoproliferative syndrome, X-linked; ; SH2D1A
 Lysinuric protein intolerance; ; SLC7A7
 Lysosomal acid phosphatase deficiency; ; ACP2
 Lysyl hydroxylase 3 deficiency; ; PLOD3
 Machado–Joseph disease; ; ATXN3
 Macrocephaly, alopecia, cutis laxa, and scoliosis; ; RIN2
 Macrocephaly/autism syndrome; ; PTEN
 Macrocytic anemia, refractory, due to 5q deletion, somatic; ; RPS14
 Macrothrombocytopenia and progressive sensorineural deafness; ; MYH9
 Macrothrombocytopenia; ; GATA1
 Macrothrombocytopenia, autosomal dominant, TUBB1-related; ; TUBB1
 Macular corneal dystrophy; ; CHST6
 Macular degeneration, age-related, 11; ; CST3
 Macular degeneration, age-related, 2; ; ABCA4
 Macular degeneration, age-related, 3; ; FBLN5
 Macular degeneration juvenile; ; CNGB3
 Macular dystrophy, autosomal dominant, chromosome 6-linked; ; ELOVL4
 Macular dystrophy, patterned; ; PRPH2
 Macular dystrophy, retinal, 2; ; PROM1
 Macular dystrophy, vitelliform; ; PRPH2
 Majeed syndrome; ; LPIN2
 Major depressive disorder 1; ; MDD1
 Major depressive disorder 2; ; MDD2
 Male infertility with large-headed, multiflagellar, polyploid spermatozoa; ; STK13
 Male infertility, nonsyndromic, autosomal recessive; ; CATSPER1
 Malonyl-CoA decarboxylase deficiency; ; MLYCD
 Mandibuloacral dysplasia with type B lipodystrophy; ; ZMPSTE24
 Mandibuloacral dysplasia; ; LMNA
 Mannosidosis, alpha-, types I and II; ; MAN2B1
 Mannosidosis, beta; ; MANBA
 Maple syrup urine disease, type Ia; ; BCKDHA
 Maple syrup urine disease, type Ib; ; BCKDHB
 Maple syrup urine disease, type II; ; DBT
 Maple syrup urine disease, type III; ; DLD
 Marfan syndrome; ; FBN1
 Marinesco–Sjögren syndrome; ; SIL1
 Maroteaux–Lamy syndrome, several forms; ; ARSB
 Marshall syndrome; ; COL11A1
 Martsolf syndrome; ; RAB3GAP2
 MASA syndrome; ; L1CAM
 MASS syndrome; ; FBN1
 Mast syndrome; ; ACP33
 Maturity-onset diabetes of the young 6; ; NEUROD1
 Maturity-onset diabetes of the young, type 10; ; INS
 Maturity-onset diabetes of the young, type 11; ; BLK
 Maturity-onset diabetes of the young, type IX; ; PAX4
 Maturity-onset diabetes of the young, type VII; ; KLF11
 Maturity-onset diabetes of the young, type VIII; ; CEL
 May–Hegglin anomaly; ; MYH9
 McArdle disease; ; PYGM
 McCune–Albright syndrome; ; GNAS
 McKusick–Kaufman syndrome; ; MKKS
 Meacham syndrome; ; WT1
 Meckel syndrome 7; ; NPHP3
 Meckel syndrome type 4; ; CEP290
 Meckel syndrome, type 1; ; MKS1
 Meckel syndrome, type 3; ; TMEM67
 Meckel syndrome, type 5; ; RPGRIP1L
 Meckel syndrome, type 6; ; CC2D2A
 Medullary cystic kidney disease 2; ; UMOD
 Medullary thyroid carcinoma; ; RET
 Medullary thyroid carcinoma, familial; ; NTRK1
 Medulloblastoma; ; PTCH2
 Medulloblastoma, desmoplastic; ; SUFU
 Meesmann corneal dystrophy; ; KRT12
 Meesmann corneal dystrophy; ; KRT3
 Megalencephalic leukoencephalopathy with subcortical cysts; ; MLC1
 Megaloblastic anemia-1, Finnish type; ; CUBN
 Megaloblastic anemia-1, Norwegian type; ; AMN
 Melanoma and neural system tumor syndrome; ; CDKN2A
 Melanoma; ; CDK4
 Melanoma, cutaneous malignant, 2; ; CDKN2A
 Meleda disease; ; SLURP1
 Melnick–Needles syndrome; ; FLNA
 Melorheostosis with osteopoikilosis; ; LEMD3
 Membranoproliferative glomerulonephritis with CFH deficiency; ; HF1
 Meningioma; ; MN1
 Meningioma, NF2-related, somatic; ; NF2
 Menkes disease; ; ATP7A
 Mental retardation and microcephaly with pontine and cerebellar hypoplasia; ; CASK
 Mental retardation in cri-du-chat syndrome; ; CTNND2
 Mental retardation syndrome, X-linked, Cabezas type; ; CUL4B
 Mental retardation syndrome, X-linked, Siderius type; ; PHF8
 Mental retardation, autosomal dominant 1; ; MBD5
 Mental retardation, autosomal dominant 3; ; CDH15
 Mental retardation, autosomal dominant 4; ; KIRREL3
 Mental retardation, autosomal dominant 5; ; SYNGAP
 Mental retardation, autosomal recessive 1; ; PRSS12
 Mental retardation, autosomal recessive 13; ; TRAPPC9
 Mental retardation, autosomal recessive 2A; ; CRBN
 Mental retardation, autosomal recessive 3; ; CC2D1A
 Mental retardation, autosomal recessive 7; ; TUSC3
 Mental retardation, autosomal recessive, 6; ; GRIK2
 Mental retardation, FRA12A type; ; DIP2B
 Mental retardation, joint hypermobility and skin laxity, with or without metabolic abnormalities; ; PYCS
 Mental retardation, stereotypic movements, epilepsy, and/or cerebral malformations; ; MEF2C
 Mental retardation, truncal obesity, retinal dystrophy, and micropenis; ; INPP5E
 Mental retardation, X-linked 1; ; IQSEC2
 Mental retardation, X-linked 17/31, microduplication; ; HSD17B10
 Mental retardation, X-linked 30; ; PAK3
 Mental retardation, X-linked 36/43/54; ; ARX
 Mental retardation, X-linked 45; ; ZNF81
 Mental retardation, X-linked 58; ; TM4SF2
 Mental retardation, X-linked 59; ; AP1S2
 Mental retardation, X-linked 93; ; BRWD3
 Mental retardation, X-linked 94; ; GRIA3
 Mental retardation, X-linked 95; ; MAGT1
 Mental retardation, X-linked nonspecific; ; GDI1
 Mental retardation, X-linked nonspecific, 63; ; ACSL4
 Mental retardation, X-linked nonspecific, type 46; ; ARHGEF6
 Mental retardation, X-linked syndromic 10; ; HSD17B10
 Mental retardation, X-linked syndromic, Christianson type; ; SLC9A6
 Mental retardation, X-linked syndromic, Turner type; ; HUWE1
 Mental retardation, X-linked, 21/34; ; IL1RAPL1
 Mental retardation, X-linked; ; NLGN4
 Mental retardation, X-linked, FRAXE type; ; AFF2
 Mental retardation, X-linked, Lubs type; ; MECP2
 Mental retardation, X-linked, Snyder-Robinson type; ; SMS
 Mental retardation, X-linked, syndromic 13; ; MECP2
 Mental retardation, X-linked, syndromic 14; ; UPF3B
 Mental retardation, X-linked, syndromic, JARID1C-related; ; KDM5C
 Mental retardation, X-linked, with cerebellar hypoplasia and distinctive facial appearance; ; OPHN1
 Mental retardation, X-linked, with epilepsy; ; ATP6AP2
 Mental retardation, X-linked, with isolated growth hormone deficiency; ; SOX3
 Mental retardation, X-linked, with or without epilepsy; ; SYP
 Mental retardation, X-linked, ZDHHC9-related; ; ZDHHC9
 Mental retardation, X-linked-72; ; RAB39B
 Mental retardation, X-linked-9; ; FTSJ1
 Mental retardation, X-linked-91; ; ZDHHC15
 Mental retardation-hypotonic facies syndrome, X-linked, 2; ; CUL4B
 Mental retardation-hypotonic facies syndrome, X-linked; ; ATRX
 Mephenytoin poor metabolizer; ; CYP2C
 Metachondromatosis; ; PTPN11
 Metachromatic leukodystrophy due to SAP-b deficiency; ; PSAP
 Metachromatic leukodystrophy; ; ARSA
 Metaphyseal anadysplasia 1; ; MMP13
 Metaphyseal anadysplasia 2; ; MMP9
 Metaphyseal chondrodysplasia, Murk Jansen type; ; PTHR1
 Metaphyseal dysplasia without hypotrichosis; ; RMRP
 Metatropic dysplasia; ; TRPV4
 Methemoglobinemia, type I; ; CYB5R3
 Methemoglobinemia, type II; ; CYB5R3
 Methemoglobinemia, type IV; ; CYB5A
 Methionine adenosyltransferase deficiency, autosomal recessive; ; MAT1A
 Methylcobalamin deficiency, cblG type; ; MTR
 Methylmalonic aciduria and homocystinuria, cblC type; ; MMACHC
 Methylmalonic aciduria and homocystinuria, cblD type; ; C2orf25
 Methylmalonic aciduria and homocystinuria, cblF type; ; LMBRD1
 Methylmalonic aciduria due to transcobalamin receptor defect; ; CD320
 Methylmalonic aciduria, cblD type, variant 2; ; C2orf25
 Methylmalonic aciduria, vitamin B12-responsive; ; MMAA
 Methylmalonic aciduria, vitamin B12-responsive, due to defect in synthesis of adenosylcobalamin, cblB complementation type; ; MMAB
 Methylmalonyl-CoA epimerase deficiency; ; MCEE
 Mevalonic aciduria; ; MVK
 MHC class II deficiency, complementation group B; ; RFXANK
 Micochondrial phosphate carrier deficiency; ; SLC25A3
 Microcephalic osteodysplastic primordial dwarfism type II; ; PCNT
 Microcephaly and digital abnormalities with normal intelligence; ; MYCN
 Microcephaly, Amish type; ; SLC25A19
 Microcephaly, autosomal recessive 1; ; MCPH1
 Microcephaly, primary autosomal recessive, 2; ; MCPH2
 Microcephaly, primary autosomal recessive, 3; ; CDK5RAP2
 Microcephaly, primary autosomal recessive, 4; ; MCPH4
 Microcephaly, primary autosomal recessive, 5, with or without simplified gyral pattern; ; ASPM
 Microcephaly, primary autosomal recessive, 6; ; CEMPJ
 Microcephaly, primary autosomal recessive, 7; ; STIL
 Microcephaly, seizures, and developmental delay; ; PNKP
 Microcornea, rod-cone dystrophy, cataract, and posterior staphyloma; ; BEST1
 Microphthalmia, isolated 2; ; CHX10
 Microphthalmia, isolated 3; ; RAX
 Microphthalmia, isolated 4; ; GDF6
 Microphthalmia, isolated 5; ; MFRP
 Microphthalmia, isolated, with cataract 2; ; SIX6
 Microphthalmia, isolated, with cataract 4; ; CRYBA4
 Microphthalmia, isolated, with coloboma 3; ; CHX10
 Microphthalmia, isolated, with coloboma 5; ; SHH
 Microphthalmia, syndromic 2; ; BCOR
 Microphthalmia, syndromic 3; ; SOX2
 Microphthalmia, syndromic 5; ; OTX2
 Microphthalmia, syndromic 6; ; BMP4
 Microphthalmia, syndromic 7; ; HCCS
 Microphthalmia, syndromic 9; ; STRA6
 Microtia, hearing impairment, and cleft palate; ; HOXA2
 Microvillus inclusion disease; ; MYO5B
 Migraine, familial basilar; ; ATP1A2
 Migraine, familial hemiplegic, 2; ; ATP1A2
 Migraine, familial hemiplegic, 3; ; SCN1A
 Migraine, resistance to; ; EDNRA
 Miller syndrome; ; DHODH
 Minicore myopathy with external ophthalmoplegia; ; RYR1
 Mirror movements, congenital; ; DCC
 Mirror-image polydactyly; ; MIPOL1
 Mismatch repair cancer syndrome; ; MLH1
 Mismatch repair cancer syndrome; ; MSH2
 Mismatch repair cancer syndrome; ; MSH6
 Mismatch repair cancer syndrome; ; PMS2
 Mitochondrial complex 1 deficiency; ; C20orf7
 Mitochondrial complex I deficiency; ; NDUFA1
 Mitochondrial complex I deficiency; ; NDUFA11
 Mitochondrial complex I deficiency; ; NDUFAF2
 Mitochondrial complex I deficiency; ; NDUFAF3
 Mitochondrial complex I deficiency; ; NDUFAF4
 Mitochondrial complex I deficiency; ; NDUFS1
 Mitochondrial complex I deficiency; ; NDUFS2
 Mitochondrial complex I deficiency; ; NDUFS4
 Mitochondrial complex I deficiency; ; NDUFV1
 Mitochondrial complex I deficiency; ; NDUFV2
 Mitochondrial complex II deficiency; ; SDHAF1
 Mitochondrial complex III deficiency; ; BCS1L
 Mitochondrial complex III deficiency; ; UQCRB
 Mitochondrial complex III deficiency; ; UQCRQ
 Mitochondrial complex IV deficiency; ; FASTKD2
 Mitochondrial DNA depletion syndrome, encephalomyopathic form, with methylmalonic aciduria; ; SUCLA2
 Mitochondrial DNA depletion syndrome, encephalomyopathic form, with renal tubulopathy; ; RRM2B
 Mitochondrial DNA depletion syndrome, hepatocerebral form; ; C10orf2
 Mitochondrial DNA depletion syndrome, hepatocerebral form; ; MPV17
 Mitochondrial DNA depletion syndrome, myopathic form; ; TK2
 Mitochondrial DNA-depletion syndrome, hepatocerebral form; ; DGUOK
 Mitochondrial myopathy and sideroblastic anemia; ; PUS1
 Mitochondrial neurogastrointestinal encephalomyopathy syndrome; ; TYMP
 Mitochondrial respiratory chain complex II deficiency; ; SDHA
 Miyoshi muscular dystrophy 3; ; ANO5
 Miyoshi myopathy; ; DYSF
 MNGIE without leukoencephalopathy; ; POLG
 MODY, type I; ; HNF4A
 MODY, type II; ; GCK
 MODY, type III; ; HNF1A
 MODY, type IV; ; IPF1
 Mohr–Tranebjærg syndrome; ; TIMM8A
 Molybdenum cofactor deficiency, type A; ; MOCS1
 Molybdenum cofactor deficiency, type B; ; MOCS2
 Molybdenum cofactor deficiency, type C; ; GPHN
 Monilethrix; ; KRT81
 Monilethrix; ; KRT83
 Monilethrix; ; KRT86
 Mononeuropathy of the median nerve, mild; ; SH3TC2
 Morning glory disc anomaly; ; PAX6
 Morquio syndrome B; ; GLB1
 Mosaic variegated aneuploidy syndrome; ; BUB1B
 Mowat–Wilson syndrome; ; ZEB2
 Muckle–Wells syndrome; ; NLRP3
 Mucolipidosis II alpha/beta; ; GNPTAB
 Mucolipidosis III alpha/beta; ; GNPTAB
 Mucolipidosis III gamma; ; GNPTAG
 Mucolipidosis IV; ; MCOLN1
 Mucopolysaccharidosis Ih; ; IDUA
 Mucopolysaccharidosis Ih/s; ; IDUA
 Mucopolysaccharidosis Is; ; IDUA
 Mucopolysaccharidosis IVA; ; GALNS
 Mucopolysaccharidosis type IIID; ; GNS
 Mucopolysaccharidosis type IX; ; HYAL1
 Mucopolysaccharidosis VII; ; GUSB
 Muenke syndrome; ; FGFR3
 Muir–Torre syndrome; ; MLH1
 Muir–Torre syndrome; ; MSH2
 Mulibrey nanism; ; TRIM37
 Mullerian aplasia and hyperandrogenism; ; WNT4
 Multiple cutaneous and uterine leiomyomata; ; FH
 Multiple endocrine neoplasia IIA; ; RET
 Multiple endocrine neoplasia IIB; ; RET
 Multiple endocrine neoplasia, type IV; ; CDKN1B
 Multiple pterygium syndrome, lethal type; ; CHRNA1
 Multiple pterygium syndrome, lethal type; ; CHRND
 Multiple pterygium syndrome, lethal type; ; CHRNG
 Multiple sulfatase deficiency; ; SUMF1
 Multiple synostoses syndrome 3; ; FGF9
 Muscle glycogenosis; ; PHKA1
 Muscular dystrophy with epidermolysis bullosa simplex; ; PLEC1
 Muscular dystrophy, congenital merosin-deficient; ; LAMA2
 Muscular dystrophy, congenital, due to ITGA7 deficiency; ; ITGA7
 Muscular dystrophy, congenital, due to partial LAMA2 deficiency; ; LAMA2
 Muscular dystrophy, limb-girdle, type 1A; ; TTID
 Muscular dystrophy, limb-girdle, type 1B; ; LMNA
 Muscular dystrophy, limb-girdle, type 2A; ; CAPN3
 Muscular dystrophy, limb-girdle, type 2B; ; DYSF
 Muscular dystrophy, limb-girdle, type 2C; ; SGCG
 Muscular dystrophy, limb-girdle, type 2D; ; SGCA
 Muscular dystrophy, limb-girdle, type 2E; ; SGCB
 Muscular dystrophy, limb-girdle, type 2F; ; SGCD
 Muscular dystrophy, limb-girdle, type 2G; ; TCAP
 Muscular dystrophy, limb-girdle, type 2H; ; TRIM32
 Muscular dystrophy, limb-girdle, type 2J; ; TTN
 Muscular dystrophy, limb-girdle, type 2L; ; ANO5
 Muscular dystrophy, limb-girdle, type IC; ; CAV3
 Muscular dystrophy, rigid spine, 1; ; SEPN1
 Myasthenia, limb-girdle, familial; ; AGRN
 Myasthenia, limb-girdle, familial; ; DOK7
 Myasthenic syndrome, congenital, associated with acetylcholine receptor deficiency; ; CHRNB1
 Myasthenic syndrome, congenital, associated with acetylcholine receptor deficiency; ; CHRNE
 Myasthenic syndrome, congenital, associated with acetylcholine receptor deficiency; ; MUSK
 Myasthenic syndrome, congenital, associated with acetylcholine receptor deficiency; ; RAPSN
 Myasthenic syndrome, congenital, associated with episodic apnea; ; CHAT
 Myasthenic syndrome, congenital, associated with facial dysmorphism and acetylcholine receptor deficiency; ; RAPSN
 Myasthenic syndrome, fast-channel congenital; ; CHRNA1
 Myasthenic syndrome, fast-channel congenital; ; CHRND
 Myasthenic syndrome, fast-channel congenital; ; CHRNE
 Myasthenic syndrome, slow-channel congenital; ; CHRNA1
 Myasthenic syndrome, slow-channel congenital; ; CHRNB1
 Myasthenic syndrome, slow-channel congenital; ; CHRND
 Myasthenic syndrome, slow-channel congenital; ; CHRNE
 Mycobacterial infection, atypical, familial disseminated; ; IFNGR1
 Mycobacterial infection, atypical, familial disseminated; ; STAT1
 Myelofibrosis, idiopathic; ; JAK2
 Myeloperoxidase deficiency; ; MPO
 Myeloproliferative disorder with eosinophilia; ; PDGFRB
 Myoclonic epilepsy, severe, of infancy; ; GABRG2
 Myoglobinuria, acute recurrent, autosomal recessive; ; LPIN1
 Myokymia with neonatal epilepsy; ; KCNQ2
 Myopathy due to CPT II deficiency; ; CPT2
 Myopathy with lactic acidosis, hereditary; ; ISCU
 Myopathy, actin, congenital, with excess of thin myofilaments; ; ACTA1
 Myopathy, cardioskeletal, desmin-related, with cataract; ; CRYAB
 Myopathy, centronuclear; ; DNM2
 Myopathy, centronuclear; ; MYF6
 Myopathy, centronuclear, autosomal recessive; ; BIN1
 Myopathy, congenital, Compton-North; ; CNTN1
 Myopathy, congenital, with fiber-type disproportion 1; ; ACTA1
 Myopathy, desmin-related, cardioskeletal; ; DES
 Myopathy, distal 2; ; MATR3
 Myopathy, distal, with anterior tibial onset; ; DYSF
 Myopathy, early-onset, with fatal cardiomyopathy; ; TTN
 Myopathy, mitochondrial progressive, with congenital cataract, hearing loss, and developmental delay; ; GFER
 Myopathy, myofibrillar, BAG3-related; ; BAG3
 Myopathy, myofibrillar, filamin C-related; ; FLNC
 Myopathy, myofibrillar, ZASP-related; ; LDB3
 Myopathy, myosin storage; ; MYH7
 Myopathy, nemaline, 3; ; ACTA1
 Myopathy, proximal, with early respiratory muscle involvement; ; TTN
 Myopathy, reducing body, X-linked, childhood-onset; ; FHL1
 Myopathy, reducing body, X-linked, severe early-onset; ; FHL1
 Myopathy, spheroid body; ; TTID
 Myopathy, X-linked, with postural muscle atrophy; ; FHL1
 Myosclerosis, congenital; ; COL6A2
 Myotilinopathy; ; TTID
 Myotonia congenita, atypical, acetazolamide-responsive; ; SCN4A
 Myotonia congenita, dominant; ; CLCN1
 Myotonia congenita, recessive; ; CLCN1
 Myotonic dystrophy; ; DMPK
 Myotonic dystrophy, type 2; ; ZNF9
 Myotubular myopathy, X-linked; ; MTM1
 Myxoid liposarcoma; ; DDIT3
 Myxoma, intracardiac; ; PRKAR1A
 N syndrome; ; POLA
 N-Acetylglutamate synthase deficiency; ; NAGS
 Naegeli–Franceschetti–Jadassohn syndrome; ; KRT14
 Nail–patella syndrome; ; LMX1B
 Nance–Horan syndrome; ; NHS
 Narcolepsy 1; ; HCRT
 Nasopharyngeal carcinoma; ; TP53
 Nasu–Hakola disease; ; TREM2
 Nasu–Hakola disease; ; TYROBP
 Naxos disease; ; JUP
 Nemaline myopathy 1, autosomal dominant; ; TPM3
 Nemaline myopathy 2, autosomal recessive; ; NEB
 Nemaline myopathy 7; ; CFL2
 Nemaline myopathy; ; TPM2
 Nemaline myopathy, Amish type; ; TNNT1
 Nephrogenic syndrome of inappropriate antidiuresis; ; AVPR2
 Nephrolithiasis, type I; ; CLCN5
 Nephrolithiasis/osteoporosis, hypophosphatemic, 1; ; SLC34A1
 Nephrolithiasis/osteoporosis, hypophosphatemic, 2; ; SLC9A3R1
 Nephronophthisis 1, juvenile; ; NPHP1
 Nephronophthisis 2, infantile; ; INVS
 Nephronophthisis 3; ; NPHP3
 Nephronophthisis 4; ; NPHP4
 Nephronophthisis 7; ; GLIS2
 Nephropathy with pretibial epidermolysis bullosa and deafness; ; CD151
 Nephrosis, congenital, with or without ocular abnormalities; ; LAMB2
 Nephrotic syndrome, type 1; ; NPHS1
 Nephrotic syndrome, type 2; ; PDCN
 Nephrotic syndrome, type 3; ; PLCE1
 Nephrotic syndrome, type 4; ; WT1
 Netherton syndrome; ; SPINK5
 Neural tube defect; ; VANGL1
 Neuroblastoma; ; NME1
 Neurodegeneration due to cerebral folate transport deficiency; ; FOLR1
 Neurodegeneration with brain iron accumulation 1; ; PANK2
 Neurodegeneration with brain iron accumulation 2B; ; PLA2G6
 Neurodegeneration with brain iron accumulation 3; ; FTL
 Neuroepithelioma; ; EWSR1
 Neurofibromatosis, familial spinal; ; NF1
 Neurofibromatosis type 1; ; NF1
 Neurofibromatosis type 2; ; NF2
 Neurofibromatosis-Noonan syndrome; ; NF1
 Neuromuscular disease, congenital, with uniform type 1 fiber; ; RYR1
 Neuronopathy, distal hereditary motor, type IIC; ; HSPB3
 Neuronopathy, distal hereditary motor, type VI; ; IGHMBP2
 Neuropathy, congenital hypomyelinating, 1; ; EGR2
 Neuropathy, congenital hypomyelinating; ; MPZ
 Neuropathy, distal hereditary motor, type IIA; ; HSPB8
 Neuropathy, distal hereditary motor, type IIB; ; HSPB1
 Neuropathy, distal hereditary motor, type V; ; BSCL2
 Neuropathy, distal hereditary motor, type V; ; GARS
 Neuropathy, distal hereditary motor, type VIIB; ; DCTN1
 Neuropathy, hereditary sensory and autonomic, type 1; ; SPTLC1
 Neuropathy, hereditary sensory and autonomic, type II; ; WNK1
 Neuropathy, hereditary sensory and autonomic, type IIB; ; FAM134B
 Neuropathy, hereditary sensory and autonomic, type V; ; NGFB
 Neuropathy, hereditary sensory, with spastic paraplegia; ; CCT5
 Neuropathy, hereditary sensory/autonomic, type IC; ; SPTLC2
 Neuropathy, recurrent, with pressure palsies; ; PMP22
 Neutral lipid storage disease with myopathy; ; PNPLA2
 Neutropenia, nonimmune chronic idiopathic, of adults; ; GFI1
 Neutropenia, severe congenital, autosomal dominant 1; ; ELANE
 Neutropenia, severe congenital, autosomal dominant 2; ; GFI1
 Neutropenia, severe congenital, autosomal recessive 3; ; HAX1
 Neutropenia, severe congenital, autosomal recessive 4; ; G6PC3
 Neutropenia, severe congenital, X-linked; ; WAS
 Neutrophil immunodeficiency syndrome; ; RAC2
 Neutrophilia, hereditary; ; CSF3R
 Nevo syndrome; ; PLOD
 Nevus, epidermal; ; PIK3CA
 Nevus, epidermal, epidermolytic hyperkeratotic type; ; KRT10
 Nevus, keratinocytic, nonepidermolytic; ; FGFR3
 Newfoundland rod-cone dystrophy; ; RLBP1
 Niemann–Pick disease, type A; ; SMPD1
 Niemann–Pick disease, type B; ; SMPD1
 Niemann–Pick disease, type C1; ; NPC1
 Niemann–Pick disease, type C2; ; NPC2
 Niemann–Pick disease type D; ; NPC1
 Night blindness, congenital stationary, autosomal dominant 2; ; PDE6B
 Night blindness, congenital stationary, autosomal dominant 3; ; GNAT1
 Night blindness, congenital stationary, type 1; ; CSNB1
 Night blindness, congenital stationary, type 1B; ; GRM6
 Night blindness, congenital stationary, type 2B; ; CABP4
 Night blindness, congenital stationary, type IC; ; TRPM1
 Night blindness, congenital stationary, X-linked, type 2A; ; CACNA1F
 Night blindness, congenital stationary, autosomal dominant 1; ; RHO
 Nijmegen breakage syndrome; ; NBS1
 Nijmegen breakage syndrome-like disorder; ; RAD50
 Nonaka myopathy; ; GNE
 Non-Hodgkin lymphoma, somatic; ; CASP10
 Nonsmall cell lung cancer, response to tyrosine kinase inhibitor in; ; EGFR
 Nonsmall cell lung cancer, somatic; ; IRF1
 Nonsmall cell lung cancer, somatic; ; PIK3CA
 Noonan syndrome 1; ; PTPN11
 Noonan syndrome 3; ; KRAS
 Noonan syndrome 4; ; SOS1
 Noonan syndrome 5; ; RAF1
 Noonan syndrome 6; ; NRAS
 Noonan-like syndrome with loose anagen hair; ; SHOC2
 Norrie disease; ; NDP
 Norum disease; ; LCAT
 Nystagmus 1, congenital, X-linked; ; FRMD7
 Nystagmus 6, congenital, X-linked; ; GPR143
 Obesity with impaired prohormone processing; ; PCSK1
 Obesity, adrenal insufficiency, and red hair due to POMC deficiency; ; POMC
 Obesity, autosomal dominant; ; MC4R
 Obesity, mild, early-onset; ; NR0B2
 Obesity, severe; ; PPARG
 Obesity, severe; ; SIM1
 Occipital horn syndrome; ; ATP7A
 Ocular albinism, type I, Nettleship-Falls type; ; GPR143
 Oculoauricular syndrome; ; HMX1
 Oculocutaneous albinism, type IV; ; SLC45A2
 Oculodentodigital dysplasia; ; GJA1
 Oculodentodigital dysplasia, autosomal recessive; ; GJA1
 Oculopharyngeal muscular dystrophy; ; PABPN1
 Odontohypophosphatasia; ; ALPL
 Odontoonychodermal dysplasia; ; WNT10A
 Ogden syndrome; ; NAA10
 Oguchi disease-1; ; SAG
 Oguchi disease-2; ; GRK1
 OI type II; ; COL1A1
 OI type III; ; COL1A1
 OI type IV; ; COL1A1
 Oligodontia-colorectal cancer syndrome; ; AXIN2
 Omenn syndrome; ; DCLRE1C
 Omenn syndrome; ; RAG1
 Omenn syndrome; ; RAG2
 Omodysplasia 1; ; GPC6
 Opitz G syndrome, type I; ; MID1
 Opitz–Kaveggia syndrome; ; MED12
 Opremazole poor metabolizer; ; CYP2C
 Optic atrophy 1; ; OPA1
 Optic atrophy and cataract; ; OPA3
 Optic atrophy and deafness; ; OPA1
 Optic atrophy-7; ; TMEM126A
 Optic nerve coloboma with renal disease; ; PAX2
 Optic nerve hypoplasia and abnormalities of the central nervous system; ; SOX2
 Optic nerve hypoplasia; ; PAX6
 Oral-facial-digital syndrome 1; ; OFD1
 Ornithine transcarbamylase deficiency; ; OTC
 Orofacial cleft 11; ; BMP4
 Orofacial cleft 5; ; MSX1
 Orofacial cleft 6; ; IRF6
 Orofacial cleft 7; ; HVEC
 Orofacial cleft 8; ; TP63
 Orthostatic intolerance; ; SLC6A2
 Osseous heteroplasia, progressive; ; GNAS
 Ossification of posterior longitudinal ligament of spine; ; ENPP1
 Osteoarthritis with mild chondrodysplasia; ; COL2A1
 Osteochondritis dissecans, short stature, and early-onset osteoarthritis; ; ACAN
 Osteogenesis imperfecta, type I; ; COL1A1
 Osteogenesis imperfecta, type II; ; COL1A2
 Osteogenesis imperfecta, type IIB; ; CRTAP
 Osteogenesis imperfecta, type III; ; COL1A2
 Osteogenesis imperfecta, type IV; ; COL1A2
 Osteogenesis imperfecta, type IX; ; PPIB
 Osteogenesis imperfecta, type VI; ; FKBP10
 Osteogenesis imperfecta, type VII; ; CRTAP
 Osteogenesis imperfecta, type VIII; ; LEPRE1
 Osteoglophonic dysplasia; ; FGFR1
 Osteolysis, familial expansile; ; TNFRSF11A
 Osteopathia striata with cranial sclerosis; ; FAM123B
 Osteopetrosis, AD type I; ; LRP5
 Osteopetrosis, autosomal dominant 2; ; CLCN7
 Osteopetrosis, autosomal recessive 2; ; TNFSF11
 Osteopetrosis, autosomal recessive 3, with renal tubular acidosis; ; CA2
 Osteopetrosis, autosomal recessive 4; ; CLCN7
 Osteopetrosis, autosomal recessive 5; ; OSTM1
 Osteopetrosis, autosomal recessive 6; ; PLEKHM1
 Osteopetrosis, autosomal recessive 7; ; TNFRSF11A
 Osteopetrosis, recessive 1; ; TCIRG1
 Osteopoikilosis; ; LEMD3
 Osteoporosis, involutional; ; VDR
 Osteoporosis-pseudoglioma syndrome; ; LRP5
 Osteosarcoma; ; LOH18CR1
 Osteosarcoma; ; RB1
 Osteosarcoma; ; TP53
 Osteosarcoma, somatic; ; CHEK2
 Osteosclerosis; ; LRP5
 Otofaciocervical syndrome; ; EYA1
 Otopalatodigital syndrome, type I; ; FLNA
 Otopalatodigital syndrome, type II; ; FLNA
 Otospondylomegaepiphyseal dysplasia; ; COL11A2
 Ovarian cancer; ; CTNNB1
 Ovarian cancer, somatic; ; AKT1
 Ovarian cancer, somatic; ; PIK3CA
 Ovarian dysgenesis 1; ; FSHR
 Ovarian dysgenesis 2; ; BMP15
 Ovarian hyperstimulation syndrome; ; FSHR
 Ovarian response to FSH stimulation; ; FSHR
 Ovarioleukodystrophy; ; EIF2B2
 Ovarioleukodystrophy; ; EIF2B4
 Ovarioleukodystrophy; ; EIF2B5
 Pachyonychia congenita Jackson Lawler type; ; KRT17
 Pachyonychia congenita Jackson Lawler type; ; KRT6B
 Pachyonychia congenita, Jadassohn-Lewandowsky type; ; KRT16
 Pachyonychia congenita, Jadassohn-Lewandowsky type; ; KRT6A
 Paget disease of bone; ; PDB4
 Paget disease of bone; ; SQSTM1
 Paget disease of bone; ; TNFRSF11A
 Paget disease, juvenile; ; TNFRSF11B
 Pallister–Hall syndrome; ; GLI3
 Palmoplantar hyperkeratosis and true hermaphroditism; ; RSPO1
 Palmoplantar hyperkeratosis with squamous cell carcinoma of skin and sex reversal; ; RSPO1
 Palmoplantar keratoderma, nonepidermolytic; ; KRT16
 Palmoplantar keratoderma, nonepidermolytic, focal; ; KRT16
 Palmoplantar verrucous nevus, unilateral; ; KRT16
 Pancreatic agenesis; ; IPF1
 Pancreatic cancer; ; TP53
 Pancreatic cancer; ; BRCA2
 Pancreatic cancer/melanoma syndrome; ; CDKN2A
 Pancreatic carcinoma, somatic; ; KRAS
 Pancreatitis, hereditary; ; PRSS1
 Pancreatitis, hereditary; ; SPINK1
 Panhypopituitarism, X-linked; ; SOX3
 Papillon–Lefèvre syndrome; ; CTSC
 Paraganglioma and gastric stromal sarcoma; ; SDHB
 Paraganglioma and gastric stromal sarcoma; ; SDHC
 Paraganglioma and gastric stromal sarcoma; ; SDHD
 Paraganglioma, familial chromaffin, 4; ; SDHB
 Paragangliomas 2; ; SDHAF2
 Paragangliomas, familial nonchromaffin, 1, with or without deafness; ; SDHD
 Paragangliomas, familial nonchromaffin, 3; ; SDHC
 Paramyotonia congenita; ; SCN4A
 Parathyroid adenoma with cystic changes; ; HRPT2
 Parathyroid carcinoma; ; HRPT2
 Parietal foramina 1; ; MSX2
 Parietal foramina 2; ; ALX4
 Parietal foramina with cleidocranial dysplasia; ; MSX2
 Parkes Weber syndrome; ; RASA1
 Parkinson disease 11; ; GIGYF2
 Parkinson disease 13; ; HTRA2
 Parkinson disease 15, autosomal recessive; ; FBXO7
 Parkinson disease 4; ; SNCA
 Parkinson disease 6, early onset; ; PINK1
 Parkinson disease 7, autosomal recessive early-onset; ; DJ1
 Parkinson disease 9; ; ATP13A2
 Parkinson disease, juvenile, type 2; ; PRKN
 Parkinson disease-8; ; LRRK2
 Parkinsonism-dystonia, infantile; ; SLC6A3
 Paroxysmal extreme pain disorder; ; SCN9A
 Paroxysmal nocturnal hemoglobinuria, somatic; ; PIGA
 Paroxysmal nonkinesigenic dyskinesia; ; MR1
 Partington syndrome; ; ARX
 PCWH syndrome; ; SOX10
 Peeling skin syndrome, acral type; ; TGM5
 Pelger–Huët anomaly; ; LBR
 Pelizaeus–Merzbacher disease; ; PLP1
 Pendred syndrome; ; SLC26A4
 Pentosuria; ; DCXR
 Periodic fever, familial; ; TNFRSF1A
 Periodontitis, juvenile; ; CTSC
 Periventricular heterotopia with microcephaly; ; ARFGEF2
 Peroxisomal acyl-CoA oxidase deficiency; ; ACOX1
 Perry syndrome; ; DCTN1
 Persistent Mullerian duct syndrome, type I; ; AMH
 Persistent Mullerian duct syndrome, type II; ; AMHR2
 Persistent truncus arteriosus; ; NKX2-6
 Peters anomaly; ; CYP1B1
 Peters anomaly; ; PAX6
 Peters anomaly; ; PITX2
 Peters-plus syndrome; ; B3GALTL; B3GTL
 Peutz–Jeghers syndrome; ; STK11
 Pfeiffer syndrome; ; FGFR1
 Pfeiffer syndrome; ; FGFR2
 Phenylketonuria; ; PAH
 Pheochromocytoma; ; KIF1B
 Pheochromocytoma; ; RET
 Pheochromocytoma; ; SDHB
 Pheochromocytoma; ; SDHD
 Pheochromocytoma; ; VHL
 Phosphoglycerate dehydrogenase deficiency; ; PHGDH
 Phosphoglycerate kinase 1 deficiency; ; PGK1
 Phosphoribosylpyrophosphate synthetase superactivity; ; PRPS1
 Phosphorylase kinase deficiency of liver and muscle, autosomal recessive; ; PHKB
 Phosphoserine aminotransferase deficiency; ; PSAT1
 Pick disease; ; MAPT
 Pick disease; ; PSEN1
 Piebaldism; ; SNAI2
 Pierson syndrome; ; LAMB2
 Pigmented adrenocortical disease, primary, 1; ; PRKAR1A
 Pigmented nodular adrenocortical disease, primary, 2; ; PDE11A
 Pigmented paravenous chorioretinal atrophy; ; CRB1
 Pilomatricoma; ; CTNNB1
 Pitt–Hopkins-like syndrome 1; ; CNTNAP2
 Pitt–Hopkins syndrome; ; TCF4
 Pituitary adenoma, ACTH-secreting; ; AIP
 Pituitary adenoma, growth hormone-secreting; ; AIP
 Pituitary adenoma, prolactin-secreting; ; AIP
 Pituitary hormone deficiency, combined, 1; ; POU1F1
 Pituitary hormone deficiency, combined, 2; ; PROP1
 Pituitary hormone deficiency, combined, 3; ; LHX3
 Pituitary hormone deficiency, combined, 4; ; LHX4
 Pituitary hormone deficiency, combined, 5; ; HESX1
 Plamoplantar keratoderma, epidermolytic; ; KRT1
 Plasminogen activator inhibitor, type I; ; PAI1
 Platelet disorder, familial, with associated myeloid malignancy; ; RUNX1
 Platelet glycoprotein IV deficiency; ; CD36
 Pleuropulmonary blastoma; ; DICER1
 Pneumothorax, primary spontaneous; ; FLCN
 Poikiloderma with neutropenia; ; C16orf57
 Polycystic kidney and hepatic disease; ; FCYT
 Polycystic kidney disease 2; ; PKD2
 Polycystic kidney disease, adult type I; ; PKD1
 Polycystic liver disease; ; PRKCSH
 Polycystic liver disease; ; SEC63
 Polycystic ovary syndrome; ; FST
 Polycythemia vera; ; JAK2
 Polycythemia, benign familial; ; VHL
 Polydactyly, postaxial, types A1 and B; ; GLI3
 Polydactyly, preaxial type II; ; LMBR1
 Polydactyly, preaxial, type IV; ; GLI3
 Polyhydramnios, megalencephaly, and symptomatic epilepsy; ; STRADA
 Polymicrogyria with optic nerve hypoplasia; ; TUBA8
 Polymicrogyria, asymmetric; ; TUBB2B
 Polymicrogyria, bilateral frontoparietal; ; GPR56
 Polyposis syndrome, hereditary mixed, 2; ; BMPR1A
 Polyposis, juvenile intestinal; ; BMPR1A
 Polyposis, juvenile intestinal; ; MADH4
 Pontocerebellar hypoplasia type 1; ; VRK1
 Pontocerebellar hypoplasia type 2A; ; TSEN54
 Pontocerebellar hypoplasia type 2B; ; TSEN2
 Pontocerebellar hypoplasia type 2C; ; TSEN34
 Pontocerebellar hypoplasia type 4; ; TSEN54
 Pontocerebellar hypoplasia, type 6; ; RARS2
 Popliteal pterygium syndrome; ; IRF6
 POR deficiency; ; POR
 Porencephaly; ; COL4A1
 Porokeratosis, disseminated superficial actinic, 1; ; SART3
 Porphyria cutanea tarda; ; UROD
 Porphyria variegata; ; PPOX
 Porphyria, acute hepatic; ; ALAD
 Porphyria, acute intermittent; ; HMBS
 Porphyria, acute intermittent, nonerythroid variant; ; HMBS
 Porphyria, congenital erythropoietic; ; UROS
 Porphyria, hepatoerythropoietic; ; UROD
 Prader–Willi syndrome; ; NDN
 Prader–Willi syndrome; ; SNRPN
 Precocious puberty, central; ; KISS1R
 Precocious puberty, male; ; LHCGR
 Premature chromosome condensation with microcephaly and mental retardation; ; MCPH1
 Premature ovarian failure 2B; ; FLJ22792
 Premature ovarian failure 3; ; FOXL2
 Premature ovarian failure 4; ; BMP15
 Premature ovarian failure 5; ; NOBOX
 Premature ovarian failure 6; ; FIGLA
 Premature ovarian failure 7; ; NR5A1
 Premature ovarian failure; ; DIAPH2
 Primary lateral sclerosis, juvenile; ; ALS2
 Prion disease with protracted course; ; PRNP
 Progesterone resistance; ; PGR
 Progressive external ophthalmoplegia with mitochondrial DNA deletions 3; ; SLC25A4
 Progressive external ophthalmoplegia with mitochondrial DNA deletions 3; ; C10orf2
 Progressive external ophthalmoplegia with mitochondrial DNA deletions, autosomal dominant 4; ; POLG2
 Progressive external ophthalmoplegia with mitochondrial DNA deletions, autosomal dominant, 5; ; RRM2B
 Progressive external ophthalmoplegia, autosomal dominant, with or without hypogonadism; ; POLG
 Progressive external ophthalmoplegia, autosomal recessive; ; POLG
 Progressive familial heart block, type IB; ; TRPM4
 Proguanil poor metabolizer; ; CYP2C
 Prolidase deficiency; ; PEPD
 Proliferative vasculopathy and hydraencephaly-hydrocephaly syndrome; ; FLVCR2
 Properdin deficiency, X-linked; ; PFC
 Propionicacidemia; ; PCCA
 Propionicacidemia; ; PCCB
 Prostate cancer 1, 176807; ; RNASEL
 Prostate cancer; ; BRCA2
 Prostate cancer, hereditary; ; MSR1
 Prostate cancer, progression and metastasis of; ; EPHB2
 Prostate cancer, somatic; ; KLF6
 Prostate cancer, somatic; ; MAD1L1
 Proteinuria, low molecular weight, with hypercalciuric nephrocalcinosis; ; CLCN5
 Protoporphyria, erythropoietic, autosomal dominant; ; FECH
 Protoporphyria, erythropoietic, autosomal recessive; ; FECH
 Protoporphyria, erythropoietic, X-linked dominant; ; ALAS2
 Proud syndrome; ; ARX
 Pseudoachondroplasia; ; COMP
 Pseudohermaphroditism, male, with gynecomastia; ; HSD17B3
 Pseudohyperkalemia, familial; ; PIEZO1
 Pseudohypoaldosteronism type I, autosomal dominant; ; NR3C2
 Pseudohypoaldosteronism type II; ; WNK4
 Pseudohypoaldosteronism, type I; ; SCNN1A
 Pseudohypoaldosteronism, type I; ; SCNN1B
 Pseudohypoaldosteronism, type I; ; SCNN1G
 Pseudohypoaldosteronism, type IIC; ; WNK1
 Pseudohypoparathyroidism Ia; ; GNAS
 Pseudohypoparathyroidism Ib; ; GNAS
 Pseudohypoparathyroidism Ic; ; GNAS
 Pseudohypoparathyroidism, type IB; ; GNASAS
 Pseudohypoparathyroidism, type IB; ; STX16
 Pseudovaginal perineoscrotal hypospadias; ; SRD5A2
 Pseudoxanthoma elasticum; ; ABCC6
 Pseudoxanthoma elasticum, forme fruste; ; ABCC6
 Pseudoxanthoma elasticum-like disorder with multiple coagulation factor deficiency; ; GGCX
 Ptosis, congenital; ; ZFHX4
 Pulmonary alveolar microlithiasis; ; SLC34A2
 Pulmonary alveolar proteinosis; ; CSF2RA
 Pulmonary fibrosis, idiopathic; ; SFTPA2
 Pulmonary hypertension, familial primary; ; BMPR2
 Pulmonary hypertension, primary; ; MADH9
 Pulmonary hypertension, primary, fenfluramine-associated; ; BMPR2
 Pulmonary veno occlusive disease; ; BMPR2
 Pycnodysostosis; ; CTSK
 Pyogenic bacterial infections, recurrent, due to MYD88 deficiency; ; MYD88
 Pyogenic sterile arthritis, pyoderma gangrenosum, and acne; ; PSTPIP1
 Pyridoxamine 5'-phosphate oxidase deficiency; ; PNPO
 Pyropoikilocytosis; ; SPTA1
 Pyruvate carboxylase deficiency; ; PC
 Pyruvate dehydrogenase deficiency; ; PDHA1
 Pyruvate dehydrogenase E2 deficiency; ; DLAT
 Pyruvate dehydrogenase phosphatase deficiency; ; PDP1
 Pyruvate kinase deficiency; ; PKLR
 Rabson–Mendenhall syndrome; ; INSR
 Radioulnar synostosis with amegakaryocytic thrombocytopenia; ; HOXA11
 Raine syndrome; ; FAM20C
 RAPADILINO syndrome; ; RECQL4
 Rapp–Hodgkin syndrome; ; TP63
 Recombination rate QTL 1; ; RNF212
 Refsum disease; ; PEX7
 Refsum disease; ; PHYH
 Refsum disease, infantile form; ; PEX26
 Refsum disease, infantile form; ; PXMP3
 Refsum disease, infantile; ; PEX1
 Renal adysplasia; ; UPK3A
 Renal agenesis; ; RET
 Renal carcinoma, chromophobe, somatic; ; FLCN
 Renal cell carcinoma; ; DIRC2
 Renal cell carcinoma; ; HNF1A
 Renal cell carcinoma; ; RNF139
 Renal cell carcinoma, clear cell, somatic; ; OGG1
 Renal cell carcinoma, papillary, 1; ; PRCC
 Renal cell carcinoma, papillary, 1; ; TFE3
 Renal cell carcinoma, papillary, familial and sporadic; ; MET
 Renal cell carcinoma, somatic; ; VHL
 Renal cysts and diabetes syndrome; ; HNF1B
 Renal glucosuria; ; SLC5A2
 Renal tubular acidosis with deafness; ; ATP6B1
 Renal tubular acidosis, distal, AD; ; SLC4A1
 Renal tubular acidosis, distal, AR; ; SLC4A1
 Renal tubular acidosis, distal, autosomal recessive; ; ATP6V0A4
 Renal tubular acidosis, proximal, with ocular abnormalities; ; SLC4A4
 Renal tubular dysgenesis; ; ACE
 Renal tubular dysgenesis; ; AGT
 Renal tubular dysgenesis; ; AGTR1
 Renal tubular dysgenesis; ; REN
 Renal-hepatic-pancreatic dysplasia; ; NPHP3
 Renpenning syndrome; ; PQBP1
 Restrictive dermopathy, lethal; ; ZMPSTE24
 Reticular dysgenesis; ; AK2
 Retinal cone dystrophy 3; ; PDE6H
 Retinal cone dystrophy 3B; ; KCNV2
 Retinal cone dystrophy 4; ; CACNA2D4
 Retinal degeneration, late-onset, autosomal dominant; ; C1QTNF5
 Retinal dystrophy, early-onset severe; ; ABCA4
 Retinal dystrophy, early-onset severe; ; LRAT
 Retinitis pigmentosa 33; ; SNRNP200
 Retinitis pigmentosa 51; ; TTC8
 Retinitis pigmentosa 54; ; C2orf71
 Retinitis pigmentosa 55; ; ARL6
 Retinitis pigmentosa 58; ; ZNF513
 Retinitis pigmentosa, concentric; ; BEST1
 Retinitis pigmentosa, digenic; ; PRPH2
 Retinitis pigmentosa, juvenile; ; LRAT
 Retinitis pigmentosa, juvenile, autosomal recessive; ; SPATA7
 Retinitis pigmentosa, late-onset dominant; ; CRX
 Retinitis pigmentosa, X-linked, and sinorespiratory infections, with or without deafness; ; RPGR
 Retinitis pigmentosa-1; ; RP1
 Retinitis pigmentosa-10; ; IMPDH1
 Retinitis pigmentosa-11; ; PRPF31
 Retinitis pigmentosa-12, autosomal recessive; ; CRB1
 Retinitis pigmentosa-13; ; PRPF8
 Retinitis pigmentosa-14; ; TULP1
 Retinitis pigmentosa-17; ; CA4
 Retinitis pigmentosa-18; ; HPRP3
 Retinitis pigmentosa-19; ; ABCA4
 Retinitis pigmentosa-2; ; RP2
 Retinitis pigmentosa-25; ; EYS
 Retinitis pigmentosa-26; ; CERKL
 Retinitis pigmentosa-3; ; RPGR
 Retinitis pigmentosa-30; ; FSCN2
 Retinitis pigmentosa-31; ; TOPORS
 Retinitis pigmentosa-35; ; SEMA4A
 Retinitis pigmentosa-36; ; PRCD
 Retinitis pigmentosa-37; ; NR2E3
 Retinitis pigmentosa-38; ; MERTK
 Retinitis pigmentosa-39; ; USH2A
 Retinitis pigmentosa-41; ; PROM1
 Retinitis pigmentosa-42; ; KLHL7
 Retinitis pigmentosa-45; ; CNGB1
 Retinitis pigmentosa-50; ; BEST1
 Retinitis pigmentosa-7; ; PRPH2
 Retinitis pigmentosa-9; ; RP9
 Retinitis punctata albescens; ; PRPH2
 Retinitis punctata albescens; ; RLBP1
 Retinopathy of prematurity; ; FZD4
 Rett syndrome; ; MECP2
 Rett syndrome, congenital variant; ; FOXG1B
 Rett syndrome, preserved speech variant; ; MECP2
 Revesz syndrome; ; TINF2
 Reynolds syndrome; ; LBR
 Rhabdoid predisposition syndrome 1; ; SMARCB1
 Rhabdoid tumor predisposition syndrome 2; ; SMARCA4
 Rhabdomyosarcoma 2, alveolar; ; PAX3
 Rhabdomyosarcoma 2, alveolar; ; PAX7
 Rhabdomyosarcoma; ; SLC22A1L
 Rhabdomyosarcoma, alveolar; ; FOXO1A
 Rhizomelic chondrodysplasia punctata type 1; ; PEX7
 Rhizomelic chondrodysplasia punctata type 3; ; AGPS
 Ribose-5-phosphate isomerase deficiency; ; RPIA
 Rickets due to defect in vitamin D 25-hydroxylation; ; CYP2R1
 Rickets, vitamin D-resistant, type IIA; ; VDR
 RIDDLE syndrome; ; RNF168
 Rieger or Axenfeld anomalies; ; FOXC1
 Ring dermoid of cornea; ; PITX2
 Rippling muscle disease; ; CAV3
 Rippling muscle disease-1; ; RMD1
 Roberts syndrome; ; ESCO2
 Robinow syndrome, autosomal recessive; ; ROR2
 Rolandic epilepsy, mental retardation, and speech dyspraxia; ; SRPX2
 Rothmund–Thomson syndrome; ; RECQL4
 Roussy–Lévy syndrome; ; MPZ
 Roussy–Lévy syndrome; ; PMP22
 Rubenstein-Taybi syndrome; ; CREBBP
 Rubinstein–Taybi syndrome; ; EP300
 Saccharopinuria; ; AASS
 Saethre–Chotzen syndrome with eyelid anomalies; ; TWIST1
 Saethre–Chotzen syndrome; ; FGFR2
 Saethre–Chotzen syndrome; ; TWIST1
 Salla disease; ; SLC17A5
 Sandhoff disease, infantile, juvenile, and adult forms; ; HEXB
 Sanfilippo syndrome, type A; ; SGSH
 Sanfilippo syndrome, type B; ; NAGLU
 Sanfilippo syndrome, type C; ; HGSNAT
 Sarcoidosis, early-onset; ; NOD2
 SC phocomelia syndrome; ; ESCO2
 Scapuloperoneal myopathy, X-linked dominant; ; FHL1
 Scapuloperoneal spinal muscular atrophy; ; TRPV4
 Scapuloperoneal syndrome, myopathic type; ; MYH7
 Scapuloperoneal syndrome, neurogenic, Kaeser type; ; DES
 Schimke immunoosseous dysplasia; ; SMARCAL1
 Schindler disease, type I; ; NAGA
 Schindler disease, type III; ; NAGA
 Schinzel–Giedion midface retraction syndrome; ; SETBP1
 Schizencephaly; ; EMX2
 Schizophrenia; ; DISC2
 Schneckenbecken dysplasia; ; SLC35D1
 Schöpf–Schulz–Passarge syndrome; ; WNT10A
 Schwannomatosis; ; NF2
 Schwartz–Jampel syndrome, type 1; ; HSPG2
 Sclerosteosis; ; SOST
 Sea-blue histiocyte disease; ; APOE
 Sebastian syndrome; ; MYH9
 Seborrhea-like dermatitis with psoriasiform elements; ; ZNF750
 Seckel syndrome 1; ; ATR
 SED congenita; ; COL2A1
 Segawa syndrome, recessive; ; TH
 Self-healing collodion baby; ; TGM1
 SEMD, Pakistani type; ; PAPSS2
 Senior–Loken syndrome 4; ; NPHP4
 Senior–Loken syndrome 5; ; IQCB1
 Senior–Loken syndrome 6; ; CEP290
 Senior–Loken syndrome-1; ; NPHP1
 Sensorineural deafness with mild renal dysfunction; ; BSND
 Sensory ataxic neuropathy, dysarthria, and ophthalmoparesis; ; POLG
 Septo-optic dysplasia; ; HESX1
 SERKAL syndrome; ; WNT4
 Sertoli cell-only syndrome; ; ZNF148
 SESAME syndrome; ; KCNJ10
 Severe combined immunodeficiency due to ADA deficiency; ; ADA
 Severe combined immunodeficiency with microcephaly, growth retardation, and sensitivity to ionizing radiation; ; NHEJ1
 Severe combined immunodeficiency, Athabascan type; ; DCLRE1C
 Severe combined immunodeficiency, B cell-negative; ; RAG1
 Severe combined immunodeficiency, B cell-negative; ; RAG2
 Severe combined immunodeficiency, T cell-negative, B-cell/natural killer-cell positive; ; CD3D
 Severe combined immunodeficiency, T cell-negative, B-cell/natural killer-cell positive; ; CD3E
 Severe combined immunodeficiency, T cell-negative, B-cell/natural killer-cell positive; ; PTPRC
 Severe combined immunodeficiency, T-cell negative, B-cell/natural killer cell-positive type; ; IL7R
 Severe combined immunodeficiency, X-linked; ; IL2RG
 Short QT syndrome-1; ; KCNH2
 Short QT syndrome-2; ; KCNQ1
 Short QT syndrome-3; ; KCNJ2
 Short rib-polydactyly syndrome, type III; ; DYNC2H1
 Short stature; ; GHSR
 Short stature, idiopathic familial; ; SHOX
 Short stature, idiopathic familial; ; SHOXY
 Short stature, idiopathic; ; GHR
 Shprintzen–Goldberg syndrome; ; FBN1
 Shwachman–Bodian–Diamond syndrome; ; SBDS
 Sialic acid storage disorder, infantile; ; SLC17A5
 Sialidosis, type I; ; NEU1
 Sialidosis, type II; ; NEU1
 Sialuria; ; GNE
 Sick sinus syndrome 1; ; SCN5A
 Sick sinus syndrome 2; ; HCN4
 Sickle cell anemia; ; HBB
 Silver spastic paraplegia syndrome; ; BSCL2
 Silver–Russell syndrome; ; H19
 Simpson-Golabi-Behmel syndrome, type 1; ; GPC3
 Simpson-Golabi-Behmel syndrome, type 2; ; OFD1
 Sitosterolemia; ; ABCG5
 Sitosterolemia; ; ABCG8
 Sjögren–Larsson syndrome; ; ALDH3A2
 Skeletal defects, genital hypoplasia, and mental retardation; ; ZBTB16
 Skin fragility-woolly hair syndrome; ; DSP
 Skin/hair/eye pigmentation 9, dark/light hair; ; ASIP
 Slowed nerve conduction velocity, AD; ; ARHGEF10
 Small patella syndrome; ; TBX4
 SMED, Strudwick type; ; COL2A1
 Smith–Lemli–Opitz syndrome; ; DHCR7
 Smith–Magenis syndrome; ; RAI1
 Smith–McCort dysplasia; ; DYM
 Snowflake vitreoretinal degeneration; ; KCNJ13
 Solitary median maxillary central incisor; ; SHH
 Somatostatin analog, resistance to; ; SSTR5
 Sorsby fundus dystrophy; ; TIMP3
 Sotos syndrome; ; NSD1
 Spastic ataxia, Charlevoix-Saguenay type; ; SACS
 Spastic paralysis, infantile onset ascending; ; ALS2
 Spastic paraplegia 10; ; KIF5A
 Spastic paraplegia 15; ; ZFYVE26
 Spastic paraplegia 31; ; REEP1
 Spastic paraplegia 33; ; ZFYVE27
 Spastic paraplegia 39; ; PNPLA6
 Spastic paraplegia, 44; ; GJC2
 Spastic paraplegia-11; ; SPG11
 Spastic paraplegia-13; ; HSPD1
 Spastic paraplegia-2; ; PLP1
 Spastic paraplegia-3A; ; SPG3A
 Spastic paraplegia-4; ; SPAST
 Spastic paraplegia-42; ; SLC33A1
 Spastic paraplegia-5A; ; CYP7B1
 Spastic paraplegia-6; ; NIPA1
 Spastic paraplegia-7; ; PGN
 Spastic paraplegia-8; ; KIAA0196
 Specific granule deficiency; ; CEBPE
 Speech-language disorder-1; ; FOXP2
 Spherocytosis, hereditary, type 5; ; EPB42
 Spherocytosis, type 1; ; ANK1
 Spherocytosis, type 3; ; SPTA1
 Spherocytosis, type 4; ; SLC4A1
 Spinal and bulbar muscular atrophy of Kennedy; ; AR
 Spinal muscular atrophy, distal, autosomal recessive, 4; ; PLEKHG5
 Spinal muscular atrophy, distal, X-linked 3; ; ATP7A
 Spinal muscular atrophy, late-onset, Finkel type; ; VAPB
 Spinal muscular atrophy, X-linked 2, infantile; ; UBE1
 Spinal muscular atrophy-1; ; SMN1
 Spinal muscular atrophy-2; ; SMN1
 Spinal muscular atrophy-3; ; SMN1
 Spinal muscular atrophy-4; ; SMN1
 Spinocerebellar ataxia 12; ; PPP2R2B
 Spinocerebellar ataxia 14; ; PRKCG
 Spinocerebellar ataxia 15; ; ITPR1
 Spinocerebellar ataxia 17; ; TBP
 Spinocerebellar ataxia 28; ; AFG3L2
 Spinocerebellar ataxia 31; ; BEAN
 Spinocerebellar ataxia 8; ; ATXN8OS
 Spinocerebellar ataxia 8; ; ATXN8
 Spinocerebellar ataxia with epilepsy; ; POLG
 Spinocerebellar ataxia, autosomal recessive 5; ; ZNF592
 Spinocerebellar ataxia, autosomal recessive 8; ; SYNE1
 Spinocerebellar ataxia, autosomal recessive 9; ; CABC1
 Spinocerebellar ataxia, autosomal recessive with axonal neuropathy; ; TDP1
 Spinocerebellar ataxia, infantile-onset; ; C10orf2
 Spinocerebellar ataxia-1; ; ATXN1
 Spinocerebellar ataxia-10; ; ATXN10
 Spinocerebellar ataxia-11; ; TTBK2
 Spinocerebellar ataxia-13; ; KCNC3
 Spinocerebellar ataxia-2; ; ATXN2
 Spinocerebellar ataxia-27; ; FGF14
 Spinocerebellar ataxia-5; ; SPTBN2
 Spinocerebellar ataxia-6; ; CACNA1A
 Spinocerebellar ataxia-7; ; ATXN7
 Split-hand/foot malformation 6; ; WNT10B
 Split-hand/foot malformation, type 4; ; TP63
 Spondylocarpotarsal synostosis syndrome; ; FLNB
 Spondylocheirodysplasia, Ehlers-Danlos syndrome-like; ; SLC39A13
 Spondylocostal dysostosis, autosomal recessive 2; ; MESP2
 Spondylocostal dysostosis, autosomal recessive 3; ; LFNG
 Spondylocostal dysostosis, autosomal recessive, 1; ; DLL3
 Spondylocostal dystostosis 4, autosomal dominant; ; GDF6
 Spondyloepimetaphyseal dysplasia; ; MATN3
 Spondyloepimetaphyseal dysplasia, aggrecan type; ; ACAN
 Spondyloepimetaphyseal dysplasia, Missouri type; ; MMP13
 Spondyloepiphyseal dysplasia tarda with progressive arthropathy; ; WISP3
 Spondyloepiphyseal dysplasia tarda; ; TRAPPC2
 Spondyloepiphyseal dysplasia with congenital joint dislocations; ; CHST3
 Spondyloepiphyseal dysplasia, Kimberley type; ; ACAN
 Spondylo-megaepiphyseal-metaphyseal dysplasia; ; NKX3-2
 Spondylometaepiphyseal dysplasia, short limb-hand type; ; DDR2
 Spondylometaphyseal dysplasia, Kozlowski type; ; TRPV4
 Spondyloperipheral dysplasia; ; COL2A1
 Squamous cell carcinoma, head and neck; ; ING1
 Squamous cell carcinoma, head and neck; ; TNFRSF10B
 Stapes ankylosis with broad thumb and toes; ; NOG
 STAR syndrome; ; FAM58A
 Stargardt disease 3; ; ELOVL4
 Stargardt disease 4; ; PROM1
 Stargardt disease-1; ; ABCA4
 Startle disease/hyperekplexia, autosomal dominant; ; GLRA1
 Steatocystoma multiplex; ; KRT17
 Stickler syndrome, type I; ; COL2A1
 Stickler syndrome, type II; ; COL11A1
 Stickler syndrome, type III; ; COL11A2
 Stiff skin syndrome; ; FBN1
 Stocco dos Santos X-linked mental retardation syndrome; ; SHROOM4
 Stomach cancer; ; KRAS
 Stomatocytosis I; ; EPB72
 Striatal degeneration, autosomal dominant; ; PDE8B
 Striatonigral degeneration, infantile; ; NUP62
 Stuve–Wiedemann syndrome/Schwartz–Jampel type 2 syndrome; ; LIFR
 Subcortical laminal heteropia, X-linked; ; DCX
 Succinic semialdehyde dehydrogenase deficiency; ; ALDH5A1
 Succinyl-CoA:3-oxoacid CoA transferase deficiency; ; OXCT1
 Sucrase-isomaltase deficiency, congenital; ; SI
 Sudden infant death with dysgenesis of the testes syndrome; ; TSPYL1
 Sulfite oxidase deficiency; ; SUOX
 Supranuclear palsy, progressive atypical; ; MAPT
 Supranuclear palsy, progressive; ; MAPT
 Supravalvar aortic stenosis; ; ELN
 Surfactant metabolism dysfunction, pulmonary, 1; ; SFTPB
 Surfactant metabolism dysfunction, pulmonary, 2; ; SFTPC
 Surfactant metabolism dysfunction, pulmonary, 3; ; ABCA3
 Sveinsson choreoretinal atrophy; ; TEAD1
 Symphalangism, proximal; ; GDF5
 Symphalangism, proximal; ; NOG
 Syndactyly, type III; ; GJA1
 Syndactyly, type IV; ; LMBR1
 Syndactyly, type V; ; HOXD13
 Synostoses syndrome, multiple, 1; ; NOG
 Synpolydactyly with foot anomalies; ; HOXD13
 Synpolydactyly, 3/3'4, associated with metacarpal and metatarsal synostoses; ; FBLN1
 Synpolydactyly, type II; ; HOXD13
 Tangier disease; ; ABCA1
 TARP syndrome; ; RBM10
 Tarsal-carpal coalition syndrome; ; NOG
 Tay–Sachs disease; ; HEXA
 T-cell immunodeficiency, congenital alopecia, and nail dystrophy; ; FOXN1
 Testicular microlithiasis; ; SLC34A2
 Testicular tumor, sporadic; ; STK11
 Tetra-amelia, autosomal recessive; ; WNT3
 Tetralogy of Fallot; ; GDF1
 Tetralogy of Fallot; ; JAG1
 Tetralogy of Fallot; ; ZFPM2
 Tetrology of Fallot; ; NKX2E
 Thalassemia, alpha-; ; HBA2
 Thalassemia, Hispanic gamma-delta-beta; ; LCRB
 Thalassemia-beta, dominant inclusion-body; ; HBB
 Thalassemias, alpha-; ; HBA1
 Thalassemias, beta-; ; HBB
 Thanatophoric dysplasia, type I; ; FGFR3
 Thiamine-responsive megaloblastic anemia syndrome; ; SLC19A2
 Three M syndrome 2; ; OBSL1
 Thrombocythemia, essential; ; JAK2
 Thrombocythemia, essential; ; MPL
 Thrombocythemia, essential; ; THPO
 Thrombocytopenia 4; ; CYCS
 Thrombocytopenia with beta-thalassemia, X-linked; ; GATA1
 Thrombocytopenia, congenital amegakaryocytic; ; MPL
 Thrombocytopenia, X-linked; ; WAS
 Thrombocytopenia, X-linked, intermittent; ; WAS
 Thrombocytopenia-2; ; FLJ14813
 Thrombocytopenic purpura, autoimmune; ; FCGR2C
 Thrombophilia due to elevated HRG; ; HRG
 Thrombophilia due to heparin cofactor II deficiency; ; HCF2
 Thrombophilia due to HRG deficiency; ; HRG
 Thrombophilia due to protein C deficiency, autosomal dominant; ; PROC
 Thrombophilia due to protein C deficiency, autosomal recessive; ; PROC
 Thrombophilia due to protein S deficiency; ; PROS1
 Thrombophilia, familial, due to decreased release of PLAT; ; PLAT
 Thrombophilia, X-linked, due to factor IX defect; ; F9
 Thrombosis, hyperhomocysteinemic; ; CBS
 Thrombotic thrombocytopenic purpura, familial; ; ADAMTS13
 Thryoid dyshormonogenesis 6; ; DUOX2
 Thyroid carcinoma, follicular; ; MINPP1
 Thyroid carcinoma, follicular; ; NRAS
 Thyroid carcinoma, papillary; ; GOLGA5
 Thyroid carcinoma, papillary; ; NCOA4
 Thyroid carcinoma, papillary; ; PCM1
 Thyroid carcinoma, papillary; ; PRKAR1A
 Thyroid carcinoma, papillary; ; TRIM24
 Thyroid carcinoma, papillary; ; TRIM33
 Thyroid dyshormonogenesis 1; ; SLC5A5
 Thyroid dyshormonogenesis 2A; ; TPO
 Thyroid dyshormonogenesis 3; ; TG
 Thyroid dyshormonogenesis 4; ; IYD
 Thyroid dyshormonogenesis 5; ; DUOXA2
 Thyroid hormone metabolism, abnormal; ; SECISBP2
 Thyroid hormone resistance; ; THRB
 Thyroid hormone resistance, autosomal recessive; ; THRB
 Thyroid hormone resistance, selective pituitary; ; THRB
 Thyroid papillary carcinoma; ; CCDC6
 Tibial muscular dystrophy, tardive; ; TTN
 Tietz albinism-deafness syndrome; ; MITF
 Timothy syndrome; ; CACNA1C
 Tn syndrome; ; C1GALT1C1
 Toenail dystrophy, isolated; ; COL7A1
 Tooth agenesis, selective, 1, with or without orofacial cleft; ; MSX1
 Tooth agenesis, selective, 3; ; PAX9
 Tooth agenesis, selective, 6; ; LTBP3
 Tooth agenesis, selective, X-linked 1; ; ED1
 Torg–Winchester syndrome; ; MMP2
 Tourette syndrome; ; SLITRK1
 Townes–Brocks branchiootorenal-like syndrome; ; SALL1
 Townes–Brocks syndrome; ; SALL1
 Transaldolase deficiency; ; TALDO1
 Transcobalamin II deficiency; ; TCN2
 Transient bullous of the newborn; ; COL7A1
 Transposition of the great arteries, dextro-looped 1; ; MED13L
 Treacher Collins mandibulofacial dysostosis; ; TCOF1
 Trehalase deficiency; ; TREH
 Trichodentoosseous syndrome; ; DLX3
 Trichoepithelioma, multiple familial, 1; ; CYLD1
 Trichorhinophalangeal syndrome, type I; ; TRPS1
 Trichorhinophalangeal syndrome, type III; ; TRPS1
 Trichothiodystrophy; ; ERCC2
 Trichothiodystrophy; ; ERCC3
 Trichothiodystrophy, complementation group A; ; GTF2H5
 Trichothiodystrophy, nonphotosensitive 1; ; C7orf11
 Trichotillomania; ; SLITRK1
 Trifunctional protein deficiency; ; HADHA
 Trifunctional protein deficiency; ; HADHB
 Trigonocephaly; ; FGFR1
 Trimethylaminuria; ; FMO3
 Triphalangeal thumb, type I; ; LMBR1
 Triphalangeal thumb-polysyndactyly syndrome; ; LMBR1
 Trismus-pseudocamptodactyly syndrome; ; MYH8
 Tropical calcific pancreatitis; ; SPINK1
 Troyer syndrome; ; SPG20
 Tuberous sclerosis-1; ; TSC1
 Tuberous sclerosis-2; ; TSC2
 Tumoral calcinosis, familial, normophosphatemic; ; SAMD9
 Tumoral calcinosis, hyperphosphatemic; ; KL
 Tumoral calcinosis, hyperphosphatemic, familial; ; FGF23
 Tumoral calcinosis, hyperphosphatemic, familial; ; GALNT3
 Tyrosine kinase 2 deficiency; ; TYK2
 Tyrosinemia type II; ; TAT
 Tyrosinemia type III; ; HPD
 Ullrich congenital muscular dystrophy; ; COL6A1
 Ullrich congenital muscular dystrophy; ; COL6A2
 Ullrich congenital muscular dystrophy; ; COL6A3
 Ulna and fibula, absence of, with severe limb deficiency; ; WNT7A
 Ulnar–mammary syndrome; ; TBX3
 Urocanase deficiency; ; UROC1
 Urofacial syndrome; ; HPSE2
 Usher syndrome, type 1B; ; MYO7A
 Usher syndrome, type 1C; ; USH1C
 Usher syndrome, type 1D; ; CDH23
 Usher syndrome, type 1D/F digenic; ; CDH23
 Usher syndrome, type 1D/F digenic; ; PCDH15
 Usher syndrome, type 1F; ; PCDH15
 Usher syndrome, type 1G; ; SANS
 Usher syndrome, type 2A; ; USH2A
 Usher syndrome, type 3; ; CLRN1
 Usher syndrome, type IIC; ; GPR98
 Usher syndrome, type IID; ; WHRN
 UV-sensitive syndrome; ; ERCC6
 VACTERL association; ; HOXD13
 Van Buchem disease; ; SOST
 van Buchem disease, type 2; ; LRP5
 van der Woude syndrome; ; IRF6
 Vasculopathy, retinal, with cerebral leukodystrophy; ; TREX1
 VATER association with macrocephaly and ventriculomegaly; ; PTEN
 Velocardiofacial syndrome; ; TBX1
 Venous malformations, multiple cutaneous and mucosal; ; TEK
 Ventricular fibrillation, familial, 1; ; SCN5A
 Ventricular fibrillation, paroxysmal familial, 2; ; DPP6
 Ventricular tachycardia, catecholaminergic polymorphic, 1; ; RYR2
 Ventricular tachycardia, catecholaminergic polymorphic, 2; ; CASQ2
 Ventricular tachycardia, idiopathic; ; GNAI2
 Vertical talus, congenital; ; HOXD10
 Vesicoureteral reflux 2; ; ROBO2
 VEXAS; ; UBA1
 Vitamin D-dependent rickets, type I; ; CYP27B1
 Vitamin K-dependent clotting factors, combined deficiency of, 2; ; VKORC1
 Vitamin K-dependent coagulation defect; ; GGCX
 Vitelliform macular dystrophy, adult-onset; ; BEST1
 Vitreoretinochoroidopathy; ; BEST1
 VLCAD deficiency; ; ACADVL
 Vohwinkel syndrome with ichthyosis; ; LOR
 Vohwinkel syndrome; ; GJB2
 von Hippel–Lindau disease, modification of; ; CCND1
 von Hippel–Lindau syndrome; ; VHL
 von Willebrand disease, autosomal dominant; ; VWF
 von Willebrand disease, autosomal recessive; ; VWF
 von Willebrand disease, platelet-type; ; GP1BA
 Waardenburg syndrome type 1; ; PAX3
 Waardenburg syndrome type 2D; ; SNAI2
 Waardenburg syndrome type 2E, with or without neurologic involvement; ; SOX10
 Waardenburg syndrome type 3; ; PAX3
 Waardenburg syndrome type 4A; ; EDNRB
 Waardenburg syndrome type 4B; ; EDN3
 Waardenburg syndrome type 4C; ; SOX10
 Waardenburg syndrome type IIA; ; MITF
 Waardenburg syndrome/albinism, digenic; ; TYR
 Waardenburg syndrome/ocular albinism, digenic; ; MITF
 Wagner syndrome 1; ; VCAN
 Warburg micro syndrome 1; ; RAB3GAP1
 Warfarin resistance; ; VKORC1
 Warfarin sensitivity; ; CYP2C9
 Warsaw breakage syndrome; ; DDX11
 Watson syndrome; ; NF1
 Weaver syndrome; ; NSD1
 Weill–Marchesani syndrome, dominant; ; FBN1
 Weill–Marchesani syndrome, recessive; ; ADAMTS10
 Weill–Marchesani-like syndrome; ; ADAMTS17
 Weissenbacher–Zweymüller syndrome; ; COL11A2
 Werner syndrome; ; RECQL2
 Weyers acrodental dysostosis; ; EVC
 WHIM syndrome; ; CXCR4
 White sponge nevus; ; KRT13
 White sponge nevus; ; KRT4
 Wilms' tumor 2; ; H19
 Wilms' tumor; ; BRCA2
 Wilms' tumor, somatic; ; GPC3
 Wilms' tumor, type 1; ; WT1
 Wilson's disease; ; ATP7B
 Wiskott–Aldrich syndrome; ; WAS
 Witkop syndrome; ; MSX1
 Wolcott–Rallison syndrome; ; EIF2AK3
 Wolff–Parkinson–White syndrome; ; PRKAG2
 Wolfram syndrome 2; ; CISD2
 Wolfram syndrome; ; WFS1
 Wolfram-like syndrome, autosomal dominant; ; WFS1
 Wolman disease; ; LIPA
 Woodhouse–Sakati syndrome; ; C2orf37
 Woolly hair, autosomal dominant; ; KRT74
 Woolly hair, autosomal recessive 1; ; P2RY5
 Woolly hair, autosomal recessive 2 with or without hypotrichosis; ; LIPH
 Wrinkly skin syndrome; ; ATP6V0A2
 Xanthinuria, type I; ; XDH
 Xeroderma pigmentosum group A; ; XPA
 Xeroderma pigmentosum group B; ; ERCC3
 Xeroderma pigmentosum group C; ; XPC
 Xeroderma pigmentosum group D; ; ERCC2
 Xeroderma pigmentosum group E, DDB-negative subtype; ; DDB2
 Xeroderma pigmentosum group F; ; ERCC4
 Xeroderma pigmentosum group G; ; ERCC5
 Xeroderma pigmentosum, variant type; ; POLH
 XFE progeroid syndrome; ; ERCC4
 X-inactivation, familial skewed; ; XIC
 Zellweger syndrome; ; PEX10
 Zellweger syndrome; ; PEX13
 Zellweger syndrome; ; PEX14
 Zellweger syndrome; ; PEX26
 Zellweger syndrome; ; PEX5
 Zellweger syndrome; ; PXF
 Zellweger syndrome, complementation group G; ; PEX3
 Zellweger syndrome-1; ; PEX1

External links
 https://www.ncbi.nlm.nih.gov/Omim/omimfaq.html#download

ONM
OMIM disorder codes